

497001–497100 

|-bgcolor=#d6d6d6
| 497001 ||  || — || October 30, 2002 || Kitt Peak || Spacewatch ||  || align=right | 1.9 km || 
|-id=002 bgcolor=#fefefe
| 497002 ||  || — || October 30, 2002 || Apache Point || SDSS || MAS || align=right data-sort-value="0.61" | 610 m || 
|-id=003 bgcolor=#d6d6d6
| 497003 ||  || — || October 29, 2002 || Palomar || NEAT || 3:2 || align=right | 3.9 km || 
|-id=004 bgcolor=#FA8072
| 497004 ||  || — || November 6, 2002 || Socorro || LINEAR ||  || align=right data-sort-value="0.54" | 540 m || 
|-id=005 bgcolor=#fefefe
| 497005 ||  || — || November 6, 2002 || Socorro || LINEAR ||  || align=right | 1.7 km || 
|-id=006 bgcolor=#FA8072
| 497006 ||  || — || December 31, 2002 || Socorro || LINEAR ||  || align=right data-sort-value="0.65" | 650 m || 
|-id=007 bgcolor=#E9E9E9
| 497007 ||  || — || January 5, 2003 || Socorro || LINEAR ||  || align=right data-sort-value="0.92" | 920 m || 
|-id=008 bgcolor=#E9E9E9
| 497008 ||  || — || January 24, 2003 || La Silla || A. Boattini, H. Scholl ||  || align=right data-sort-value="0.83" | 830 m || 
|-id=009 bgcolor=#B88A00
| 497009 ||  || — || January 29, 2003 || Socorro || LINEAR || unusualcritical || align=right | 3.2 km || 
|-id=010 bgcolor=#d6d6d6
| 497010 ||  || — || January 26, 2003 || Kitt Peak || Spacewatch ||  || align=right | 2.6 km || 
|-id=011 bgcolor=#E9E9E9
| 497011 ||  || — || January 27, 2003 || Wrightwood || J. W. Young ||  || align=right data-sort-value="0.79" | 790 m || 
|-id=012 bgcolor=#E9E9E9
| 497012 ||  || — || January 31, 2003 || Socorro || LINEAR ||  || align=right | 1.2 km || 
|-id=013 bgcolor=#fefefe
| 497013 ||  || — || February 26, 2003 || Campo Imperatore || CINEOS || H || align=right data-sort-value="0.73" | 730 m || 
|-id=014 bgcolor=#E9E9E9
| 497014 ||  || — || March 6, 2003 || Anderson Mesa || LONEOS ||  || align=right | 1.1 km || 
|-id=015 bgcolor=#E9E9E9
| 497015 ||  || — || March 26, 2003 || Kitt Peak || Spacewatch ||  || align=right | 1.8 km || 
|-id=016 bgcolor=#E9E9E9
| 497016 ||  || — || March 26, 2003 || Haleakala || NEAT ||  || align=right | 1.3 km || 
|-id=017 bgcolor=#E9E9E9
| 497017 ||  || — || March 24, 2003 || Kitt Peak || Spacewatch ||  || align=right | 1.3 km || 
|-id=018 bgcolor=#E9E9E9
| 497018 ||  || — || April 6, 2003 || Bergisch Gladbach || W. Bickel ||  || align=right | 1.3 km || 
|-id=019 bgcolor=#FA8072
| 497019 ||  || — || April 9, 2003 || Palomar || NEAT ||  || align=right data-sort-value="0.35" | 350 m || 
|-id=020 bgcolor=#fefefe
| 497020 ||  || — || March 24, 2003 || Kitt Peak || Spacewatch || H || align=right data-sort-value="0.70" | 700 m || 
|-id=021 bgcolor=#E9E9E9
| 497021 ||  || — || April 28, 2003 || Socorro || LINEAR ||  || align=right | 1.7 km || 
|-id=022 bgcolor=#E9E9E9
| 497022 ||  || — || May 29, 2003 || Kitt Peak || Spacewatch ||  || align=right | 2.6 km || 
|-id=023 bgcolor=#E9E9E9
| 497023 ||  || — || June 1, 2003 || Cerro Tololo || M. W. Buie ||  || align=right | 1.6 km || 
|-id=024 bgcolor=#fefefe
| 497024 ||  || — || August 19, 2003 || Campo Imperatore || CINEOS ||  || align=right data-sort-value="0.74" | 740 m || 
|-id=025 bgcolor=#FFC2E0
| 497025 ||  || — || August 24, 2003 || Socorro || LINEAR || APO || align=right data-sort-value="0.28" | 280 m || 
|-id=026 bgcolor=#FA8072
| 497026 ||  || — || August 22, 2003 || Palomar || NEAT ||  || align=right data-sort-value="0.56" | 560 m || 
|-id=027 bgcolor=#fefefe
| 497027 ||  || — || August 25, 2003 || Socorro || LINEAR ||  || align=right | 1.0 km || 
|-id=028 bgcolor=#E9E9E9
| 497028 ||  || — || August 27, 2003 || Palomar || NEAT ||  || align=right | 2.2 km || 
|-id=029 bgcolor=#fefefe
| 497029 ||  || — || August 30, 2003 || Kitt Peak || Spacewatch ||  || align=right data-sort-value="0.74" | 740 m || 
|-id=030 bgcolor=#E9E9E9
| 497030 ||  || — || August 26, 2003 || Cerro Tololo || M. W. Buie || MRX || align=right data-sort-value="0.73" | 730 m || 
|-id=031 bgcolor=#fefefe
| 497031 ||  || — || September 1, 2003 || Socorro || LINEAR ||  || align=right data-sort-value="0.82" | 820 m || 
|-id=032 bgcolor=#FA8072
| 497032 ||  || — || September 17, 2003 || Anderson Mesa || LONEOS ||  || align=right data-sort-value="0.58" | 580 m || 
|-id=033 bgcolor=#fefefe
| 497033 ||  || — || September 16, 2003 || Kitt Peak || Spacewatch ||  || align=right data-sort-value="0.68" | 680 m || 
|-id=034 bgcolor=#fefefe
| 497034 ||  || — || September 17, 2003 || Kitt Peak || Spacewatch ||  || align=right data-sort-value="0.69" | 690 m || 
|-id=035 bgcolor=#fefefe
| 497035 ||  || — || September 18, 2003 || Palomar || NEAT ||  || align=right data-sort-value="0.75" | 750 m || 
|-id=036 bgcolor=#FA8072
| 497036 ||  || — || September 16, 2003 || Kitt Peak || Spacewatch ||  || align=right data-sort-value="0.55" | 550 m || 
|-id=037 bgcolor=#E9E9E9
| 497037 ||  || — || September 17, 2003 || Kitt Peak || Spacewatch ||  || align=right | 2.1 km || 
|-id=038 bgcolor=#fefefe
| 497038 ||  || — || September 17, 2003 || Socorro || LINEAR ||  || align=right data-sort-value="0.76" | 760 m || 
|-id=039 bgcolor=#fefefe
| 497039 ||  || — || September 18, 2003 || Kitt Peak || Spacewatch ||  || align=right data-sort-value="0.68" | 680 m || 
|-id=040 bgcolor=#fefefe
| 497040 ||  || — || September 20, 2003 || Anderson Mesa || LONEOS ||  || align=right data-sort-value="0.76" | 760 m || 
|-id=041 bgcolor=#E9E9E9
| 497041 ||  || — || September 21, 2003 || Socorro || LINEAR ||  || align=right | 2.1 km || 
|-id=042 bgcolor=#fefefe
| 497042 ||  || — || September 21, 2003 || Anderson Mesa || LONEOS ||  || align=right data-sort-value="0.68" | 680 m || 
|-id=043 bgcolor=#E9E9E9
| 497043 ||  || — || September 20, 2003 || Socorro || LINEAR ||  || align=right | 2.5 km || 
|-id=044 bgcolor=#fefefe
| 497044 ||  || — || September 30, 2003 || Socorro || LINEAR ||  || align=right data-sort-value="0.57" | 570 m || 
|-id=045 bgcolor=#E9E9E9
| 497045 ||  || — || September 19, 2003 || Kitt Peak || Spacewatch || MRX || align=right | 1.0 km || 
|-id=046 bgcolor=#E9E9E9
| 497046 ||  || — || September 29, 2003 || Kitt Peak || Spacewatch ||  || align=right | 1.8 km || 
|-id=047 bgcolor=#E9E9E9
| 497047 ||  || — || September 29, 2003 || Kitt Peak || Spacewatch || HOF || align=right | 2.0 km || 
|-id=048 bgcolor=#fefefe
| 497048 ||  || — || September 18, 2003 || Haleakala || NEAT ||  || align=right data-sort-value="0.80" | 800 m || 
|-id=049 bgcolor=#FA8072
| 497049 ||  || — || September 17, 2003 || Kitt Peak || Spacewatch ||  || align=right data-sort-value="0.49" | 490 m || 
|-id=050 bgcolor=#fefefe
| 497050 ||  || — || September 19, 2003 || Kitt Peak || Spacewatch ||  || align=right data-sort-value="0.89" | 890 m || 
|-id=051 bgcolor=#fefefe
| 497051 ||  || — || September 19, 2003 || Anderson Mesa || LONEOS ||  || align=right data-sort-value="0.76" | 760 m || 
|-id=052 bgcolor=#fefefe
| 497052 ||  || — || September 17, 2003 || Kitt Peak || Spacewatch ||  || align=right data-sort-value="0.77" | 770 m || 
|-id=053 bgcolor=#E9E9E9
| 497053 ||  || — || September 18, 2003 || Kitt Peak || Spacewatch ||  || align=right | 2.3 km || 
|-id=054 bgcolor=#E9E9E9
| 497054 ||  || — || September 20, 2003 || Anderson Mesa || LONEOS ||  || align=right | 2.0 km || 
|-id=055 bgcolor=#E9E9E9
| 497055 ||  || — || September 26, 2003 || Apache Point || SDSS || HNA || align=right | 1.9 km || 
|-id=056 bgcolor=#E9E9E9
| 497056 ||  || — || September 26, 2003 || Apache Point || SDSS || HNA || align=right | 1.6 km || 
|-id=057 bgcolor=#E9E9E9
| 497057 ||  || — || September 28, 2003 || Apache Point || SDSS ||  || align=right | 1.8 km || 
|-id=058 bgcolor=#fefefe
| 497058 ||  || — || September 19, 2003 || Kitt Peak || Spacewatch ||  || align=right data-sort-value="0.50" | 500 m || 
|-id=059 bgcolor=#E9E9E9
| 497059 ||  || — || September 29, 2003 || Anderson Mesa || LONEOS ||  || align=right | 3.0 km || 
|-id=060 bgcolor=#fefefe
| 497060 ||  || — || October 1, 2003 || Kitt Peak || Spacewatch ||  || align=right data-sort-value="0.54" | 540 m || 
|-id=061 bgcolor=#E9E9E9
| 497061 ||  || — || October 17, 2003 || Anderson Mesa || LONEOS ||  || align=right | 2.8 km || 
|-id=062 bgcolor=#fefefe
| 497062 ||  || — || October 16, 2003 || Kitt Peak || Spacewatch ||  || align=right | 1.0 km || 
|-id=063 bgcolor=#fefefe
| 497063 ||  || — || October 16, 2003 || Kitt Peak || Spacewatch ||  || align=right data-sort-value="0.78" | 780 m || 
|-id=064 bgcolor=#E9E9E9
| 497064 ||  || — || October 16, 2003 || Anderson Mesa || LONEOS ||  || align=right | 2.8 km || 
|-id=065 bgcolor=#fefefe
| 497065 ||  || — || October 18, 2003 || Kitt Peak || Spacewatch ||  || align=right data-sort-value="0.50" | 500 m || 
|-id=066 bgcolor=#E9E9E9
| 497066 ||  || — || October 15, 2003 || Anderson Mesa || LONEOS || CLO || align=right | 2.3 km || 
|-id=067 bgcolor=#d6d6d6
| 497067 ||  || — || October 18, 2003 || Anderson Mesa || LONEOS ||  || align=right | 2.5 km || 
|-id=068 bgcolor=#fefefe
| 497068 ||  || — || October 21, 2003 || Kitt Peak || Spacewatch ||  || align=right data-sort-value="0.58" | 580 m || 
|-id=069 bgcolor=#fefefe
| 497069 ||  || — || October 21, 2003 || Kitt Peak || Spacewatch || NYS || align=right data-sort-value="0.62" | 620 m || 
|-id=070 bgcolor=#fefefe
| 497070 ||  || — || October 24, 2003 || Socorro || LINEAR || NYS || align=right data-sort-value="0.42" | 420 m || 
|-id=071 bgcolor=#fefefe
| 497071 ||  || — || October 19, 2003 || Kitt Peak || Spacewatch ||  || align=right data-sort-value="0.68" | 680 m || 
|-id=072 bgcolor=#fefefe
| 497072 ||  || — || October 19, 2003 || Apache Point || SDSS || NYS || align=right data-sort-value="0.58" | 580 m || 
|-id=073 bgcolor=#d6d6d6
| 497073 ||  || — || October 19, 2003 || Kitt Peak || Spacewatch ||  || align=right | 1.6 km || 
|-id=074 bgcolor=#fefefe
| 497074 ||  || — || October 22, 2003 || Apache Point || SDSS || V || align=right data-sort-value="0.43" | 430 m || 
|-id=075 bgcolor=#E9E9E9
| 497075 ||  || — || October 23, 2003 || Apache Point || SDSS || MRX || align=right | 2.1 km || 
|-id=076 bgcolor=#fefefe
| 497076 ||  || — || November 14, 2003 || Palomar || NEAT ||  || align=right data-sort-value="0.68" | 680 m || 
|-id=077 bgcolor=#fefefe
| 497077 ||  || — || November 16, 2003 || Kitt Peak || Spacewatch ||  || align=right data-sort-value="0.60" | 600 m || 
|-id=078 bgcolor=#fefefe
| 497078 ||  || — || October 20, 2003 || Kitt Peak || Spacewatch ||  || align=right data-sort-value="0.81" | 810 m || 
|-id=079 bgcolor=#fefefe
| 497079 ||  || — || November 16, 2003 || Kitt Peak || Spacewatch ||  || align=right data-sort-value="0.48" | 480 m || 
|-id=080 bgcolor=#fefefe
| 497080 ||  || — || November 16, 2003 || Kitt Peak || Spacewatch ||  || align=right data-sort-value="0.64" | 640 m || 
|-id=081 bgcolor=#E9E9E9
| 497081 ||  || — || November 23, 2003 || Catalina || CSS ||  || align=right | 2.0 km || 
|-id=082 bgcolor=#fefefe
| 497082 ||  || — || November 18, 2003 || Kitt Peak || Spacewatch ||  || align=right data-sort-value="0.67" | 670 m || 
|-id=083 bgcolor=#fefefe
| 497083 ||  || — || October 24, 2003 || Socorro || LINEAR ||  || align=right data-sort-value="0.77" | 770 m || 
|-id=084 bgcolor=#FA8072
| 497084 ||  || — || November 20, 2003 || Palomar || NEAT || PHO || align=right data-sort-value="0.81" | 810 m || 
|-id=085 bgcolor=#fefefe
| 497085 ||  || — || November 18, 2003 || Kitt Peak || Spacewatch ||  || align=right data-sort-value="0.58" | 580 m || 
|-id=086 bgcolor=#fefefe
| 497086 ||  || — || November 19, 2003 || Kitt Peak || Spacewatch || EUT || align=right data-sort-value="0.53" | 530 m || 
|-id=087 bgcolor=#fefefe
| 497087 ||  || — || November 30, 2003 || Kitt Peak || Spacewatch ||  || align=right data-sort-value="0.62" | 620 m || 
|-id=088 bgcolor=#fefefe
| 497088 ||  || — || December 1, 2003 || Kitt Peak || Spacewatch || MAS || align=right data-sort-value="0.64" | 640 m || 
|-id=089 bgcolor=#d6d6d6
| 497089 ||  || — || November 21, 2003 || Kitt Peak || Spacewatch ||  || align=right | 2.3 km || 
|-id=090 bgcolor=#fefefe
| 497090 ||  || — || December 1, 2003 || Kitt Peak || Spacewatch || NYS || align=right data-sort-value="0.50" | 500 m || 
|-id=091 bgcolor=#FA8072
| 497091 ||  || — || December 17, 2003 || Anderson Mesa || LONEOS ||  || align=right data-sort-value="0.58" | 580 m || 
|-id=092 bgcolor=#fefefe
| 497092 ||  || — || November 20, 2003 || Socorro || LINEAR || PHO || align=right data-sort-value="0.95" | 950 m || 
|-id=093 bgcolor=#FA8072
| 497093 ||  || — || December 19, 2003 || Socorro || LINEAR ||  || align=right data-sort-value="0.87" | 870 m || 
|-id=094 bgcolor=#FFC2E0
| 497094 ||  || — || January 10, 2004 || Anderson Mesa || LONEOS || AMO || align=right data-sort-value="0.59" | 590 m || 
|-id=095 bgcolor=#d6d6d6
| 497095 ||  || — || December 19, 2003 || Kitt Peak || Spacewatch ||  || align=right | 3.3 km || 
|-id=096 bgcolor=#FFC2E0
| 497096 ||  || — || January 16, 2004 || Kitt Peak || Spacewatch || AMOcritical || align=right data-sort-value="0.56" | 560 m || 
|-id=097 bgcolor=#d6d6d6
| 497097 ||  || — || January 17, 2004 || Kitt Peak || Spacewatch ||  || align=right | 2.4 km || 
|-id=098 bgcolor=#d6d6d6
| 497098 ||  || — || December 21, 2003 || Kitt Peak || Spacewatch ||  || align=right | 2.4 km || 
|-id=099 bgcolor=#FA8072
| 497099 ||  || — || January 29, 2004 || Socorro || LINEAR ||  || align=right | 1.2 km || 
|-id=100 bgcolor=#fefefe
| 497100 ||  || — || December 18, 2003 || Kitt Peak || Spacewatch || MAS || align=right data-sort-value="0.59" | 590 m || 
|}

497101–497200 

|-bgcolor=#fefefe
| 497101 ||  || — || January 16, 2004 || Kitt Peak || Spacewatch || V || align=right data-sort-value="0.60" | 600 m || 
|-id=102 bgcolor=#d6d6d6
| 497102 ||  || — || December 28, 2003 || Kitt Peak || Spacewatch ||  || align=right | 2.1 km || 
|-id=103 bgcolor=#d6d6d6
| 497103 ||  || — || January 22, 2004 || Cerro Paranal || Paranal Obs. ||  || align=right | 3.0 km || 
|-id=104 bgcolor=#d6d6d6
| 497104 ||  || — || January 26, 2004 || Anderson Mesa || LONEOS || THM || align=right | 2.6 km || 
|-id=105 bgcolor=#d6d6d6
| 497105 ||  || — || February 11, 2004 || Kitt Peak || Spacewatch ||  || align=right | 2.2 km || 
|-id=106 bgcolor=#d6d6d6
| 497106 ||  || — || January 28, 2004 || Kitt Peak || Spacewatch ||  || align=right | 2.5 km || 
|-id=107 bgcolor=#d6d6d6
| 497107 ||  || — || February 11, 2004 || Kitt Peak || Spacewatch || EUP || align=right | 3.1 km || 
|-id=108 bgcolor=#fefefe
| 497108 ||  || — || February 22, 2004 || Kitt Peak || Spacewatch || H || align=right data-sort-value="0.48" | 480 m || 
|-id=109 bgcolor=#d6d6d6
| 497109 ||  || — || February 12, 2004 || Kitt Peak || Spacewatch ||  || align=right | 2.7 km || 
|-id=110 bgcolor=#d6d6d6
| 497110 ||  || — || February 17, 2004 || Kitt Peak || Spacewatch ||  || align=right | 2.7 km || 
|-id=111 bgcolor=#d6d6d6
| 497111 ||  || — || February 17, 2004 || Socorro || LINEAR ||  || align=right | 3.0 km || 
|-id=112 bgcolor=#FA8072
| 497112 ||  || — || March 11, 2004 || Palomar || NEAT ||  || align=right | 1.5 km || 
|-id=113 bgcolor=#FFC2E0
| 497113 ||  || — || March 14, 2004 || Socorro || LINEAR || APOcritical || align=right data-sort-value="0.13" | 130 m || 
|-id=114 bgcolor=#d6d6d6
| 497114 ||  || — || March 14, 2004 || Kitt Peak || Spacewatch || TIR || align=right | 2.2 km || 
|-id=115 bgcolor=#E9E9E9
| 497115 ||  || — || March 15, 2004 || Catalina || CSS ||  || align=right | 1.7 km || 
|-id=116 bgcolor=#E9E9E9
| 497116 ||  || — || March 15, 2004 || Kitt Peak || Spacewatch ||  || align=right | 1.3 km || 
|-id=117 bgcolor=#FFC2E0
| 497117 ||  || — || March 20, 2004 || Socorro || LINEAR || APO +1kmPHA || align=right data-sort-value="0.80" | 800 m || 
|-id=118 bgcolor=#fefefe
| 497118 ||  || — || March 17, 2004 || Kitt Peak || Spacewatch ||  || align=right | 1.2 km || 
|-id=119 bgcolor=#d6d6d6
| 497119 ||  || — || March 23, 2004 || Kitt Peak || Spacewatch ||  || align=right | 2.3 km || 
|-id=120 bgcolor=#fefefe
| 497120 ||  || — || March 27, 2004 || Socorro || LINEAR ||  || align=right | 1.00 km || 
|-id=121 bgcolor=#fefefe
| 497121 ||  || — || April 13, 2004 || Desert Eagle || W. K. Y. Yeung ||  || align=right data-sort-value="0.74" | 740 m || 
|-id=122 bgcolor=#d6d6d6
| 497122 ||  || — || April 12, 2004 || Kitt Peak || Spacewatch || LIX || align=right | 3.3 km || 
|-id=123 bgcolor=#E9E9E9
| 497123 ||  || — || May 16, 2004 || Socorro || LINEAR ||  || align=right | 2.2 km || 
|-id=124 bgcolor=#E9E9E9
| 497124 ||  || — || June 15, 2004 || Socorro || LINEAR || BAR || align=right | 2.4 km || 
|-id=125 bgcolor=#fefefe
| 497125 ||  || — || July 11, 2004 || Socorro || LINEAR || H || align=right data-sort-value="0.89" | 890 m || 
|-id=126 bgcolor=#E9E9E9
| 497126 ||  || — || July 11, 2004 || Socorro || LINEAR ||  || align=right | 1.6 km || 
|-id=127 bgcolor=#E9E9E9
| 497127 ||  || — || July 14, 2004 || Socorro || LINEAR ||  || align=right | 1.4 km || 
|-id=128 bgcolor=#E9E9E9
| 497128 ||  || — || August 8, 2004 || Anderson Mesa || LONEOS ||  || align=right | 1.7 km || 
|-id=129 bgcolor=#E9E9E9
| 497129 ||  || — || August 8, 2004 || Socorro || LINEAR ||  || align=right | 1.5 km || 
|-id=130 bgcolor=#FA8072
| 497130 ||  || — || July 14, 2004 || Siding Spring || SSS ||  || align=right | 1.5 km || 
|-id=131 bgcolor=#E9E9E9
| 497131 ||  || — || August 10, 2004 || Socorro || LINEAR ||  || align=right | 1.5 km || 
|-id=132 bgcolor=#E9E9E9
| 497132 ||  || — || August 13, 2004 || Reedy Creek || J. Broughton ||  || align=right | 1.3 km || 
|-id=133 bgcolor=#FA8072
| 497133 ||  || — || August 14, 2004 || Reedy Creek || J. Broughton ||  || align=right data-sort-value="0.71" | 710 m || 
|-id=134 bgcolor=#E9E9E9
| 497134 ||  || — || August 21, 2004 || Siding Spring || SSS ||  || align=right | 1.5 km || 
|-id=135 bgcolor=#FFC2E0
| 497135 ||  || — || August 26, 2004 || Socorro || LINEAR || APO +1km || align=right data-sort-value="0.85" | 850 m || 
|-id=136 bgcolor=#E9E9E9
| 497136 ||  || — || August 23, 2004 || Siding Spring || SSS ||  || align=right | 1.4 km || 
|-id=137 bgcolor=#E9E9E9
| 497137 ||  || — || September 3, 2004 || Las Cruces || D. S. Dixon ||  || align=right | 1.2 km || 
|-id=138 bgcolor=#FA8072
| 497138 ||  || — || September 7, 2004 || Socorro || LINEAR ||  || align=right | 1.3 km || 
|-id=139 bgcolor=#E9E9E9
| 497139 ||  || — || September 7, 2004 || Kitt Peak || Spacewatch ||  || align=right | 1.2 km || 
|-id=140 bgcolor=#fefefe
| 497140 ||  || — || September 7, 2004 || Kitt Peak || Spacewatch ||  || align=right data-sort-value="0.78" | 780 m || 
|-id=141 bgcolor=#E9E9E9
| 497141 ||  || — || September 7, 2004 || Kitt Peak || Spacewatch || MIS || align=right | 1.3 km || 
|-id=142 bgcolor=#E9E9E9
| 497142 ||  || — || September 7, 2004 || Socorro || LINEAR || BAR || align=right data-sort-value="0.93" | 930 m || 
|-id=143 bgcolor=#E9E9E9
| 497143 ||  || — || September 7, 2004 || Socorro || LINEAR ||  || align=right | 1.7 km || 
|-id=144 bgcolor=#E9E9E9
| 497144 ||  || — || September 8, 2004 || Socorro || LINEAR ||  || align=right | 1.6 km || 
|-id=145 bgcolor=#E9E9E9
| 497145 ||  || — || September 8, 2004 || Socorro || LINEAR ||  || align=right | 1.5 km || 
|-id=146 bgcolor=#E9E9E9
| 497146 ||  || — || September 8, 2004 || Socorro || LINEAR || JUN || align=right data-sort-value="0.86" | 860 m || 
|-id=147 bgcolor=#E9E9E9
| 497147 ||  || — || August 27, 2004 || Catalina || CSS ||  || align=right | 1.3 km || 
|-id=148 bgcolor=#fefefe
| 497148 ||  || — || August 21, 2004 || Catalina || CSS ||  || align=right data-sort-value="0.52" | 520 m || 
|-id=149 bgcolor=#fefefe
| 497149 ||  || — || September 12, 2004 || Kitt Peak || Spacewatch || H || align=right data-sort-value="0.57" | 570 m || 
|-id=150 bgcolor=#E9E9E9
| 497150 ||  || — || August 23, 2004 || Kitt Peak || Spacewatch || EUN || align=right | 1.1 km || 
|-id=151 bgcolor=#E9E9E9
| 497151 ||  || — || September 8, 2004 || Socorro || LINEAR || (1547)  IAN || align=right | 1.4 km || 
|-id=152 bgcolor=#E9E9E9
| 497152 ||  || — || September 10, 2004 || Socorro || LINEAR || (194) || align=right | 1.7 km || 
|-id=153 bgcolor=#fefefe
| 497153 ||  || — || September 8, 2004 || Palomar || NEAT ||  || align=right data-sort-value="0.81" | 810 m || 
|-id=154 bgcolor=#fefefe
| 497154 ||  || — || September 10, 2004 || Socorro || LINEAR ||  || align=right data-sort-value="0.69" | 690 m || 
|-id=155 bgcolor=#E9E9E9
| 497155 ||  || — || August 27, 2004 || Catalina || CSS ||  || align=right | 1.3 km || 
|-id=156 bgcolor=#E9E9E9
| 497156 ||  || — || September 10, 2004 || Socorro || LINEAR ||  || align=right | 1.4 km || 
|-id=157 bgcolor=#E9E9E9
| 497157 ||  || — || September 10, 2004 || Socorro || LINEAR || JUN || align=right data-sort-value="0.91" | 910 m || 
|-id=158 bgcolor=#E9E9E9
| 497158 ||  || — || September 10, 2004 || Socorro || LINEAR ||  || align=right | 1.1 km || 
|-id=159 bgcolor=#E9E9E9
| 497159 ||  || — || September 10, 2004 || Socorro || LINEAR ||  || align=right | 1.6 km || 
|-id=160 bgcolor=#E9E9E9
| 497160 ||  || — || September 11, 2004 || Socorro || LINEAR || (1547)  IAN || align=right | 1.8 km || 
|-id=161 bgcolor=#fefefe
| 497161 ||  || — || September 9, 2004 || Socorro || LINEAR ||  || align=right data-sort-value="0.62" | 620 m || 
|-id=162 bgcolor=#E9E9E9
| 497162 ||  || — || September 11, 2004 || Kitt Peak || Spacewatch ||  || align=right | 1.3 km || 
|-id=163 bgcolor=#E9E9E9
| 497163 ||  || — || August 20, 2004 || Catalina || CSS ||  || align=right | 1.2 km || 
|-id=164 bgcolor=#FA8072
| 497164 ||  || — || September 13, 2004 || Socorro || LINEAR ||  || align=right | 1.2 km || 
|-id=165 bgcolor=#E9E9E9
| 497165 ||  || — || September 15, 2004 || Anderson Mesa || LONEOS || BRU || align=right | 2.2 km || 
|-id=166 bgcolor=#fefefe
| 497166 ||  || — || September 15, 2004 || Kitt Peak || Spacewatch ||  || align=right data-sort-value="0.64" | 640 m || 
|-id=167 bgcolor=#E9E9E9
| 497167 ||  || — || September 8, 2004 || Socorro || LINEAR ||  || align=right | 1.3 km || 
|-id=168 bgcolor=#FA8072
| 497168 ||  || — || August 18, 2004 || Siding Spring || SSS ||  || align=right data-sort-value="0.69" | 690 m || 
|-id=169 bgcolor=#E9E9E9
| 497169 ||  || — || September 18, 2004 || Socorro || LINEAR || BAR || align=right | 1.5 km || 
|-id=170 bgcolor=#E9E9E9
| 497170 ||  || — || September 17, 2004 || Kitt Peak || Spacewatch ||  || align=right | 1.3 km || 
|-id=171 bgcolor=#E9E9E9
| 497171 ||  || — || September 18, 2004 || Socorro || LINEAR ||  || align=right | 2.1 km || 
|-id=172 bgcolor=#fefefe
| 497172 ||  || — || October 5, 2004 || Kitt Peak || Spacewatch || H || align=right data-sort-value="0.73" | 730 m || 
|-id=173 bgcolor=#FA8072
| 497173 ||  || — || October 7, 2004 || Kitt Peak || Spacewatch || H || align=right data-sort-value="0.57" | 570 m || 
|-id=174 bgcolor=#FFC2E0
| 497174 ||  || — || October 8, 2004 || Kitt Peak || Spacewatch || APO || align=right data-sort-value="0.19" | 190 m || 
|-id=175 bgcolor=#fefefe
| 497175 ||  || — || September 15, 2004 || Socorro || LINEAR || H || align=right data-sort-value="0.85" | 850 m || 
|-id=176 bgcolor=#FFC2E0
| 497176 ||  || — || October 9, 2004 || Socorro || LINEAR || AMO || align=right data-sort-value="0.74" | 740 m || 
|-id=177 bgcolor=#E9E9E9
| 497177 ||  || — || October 4, 2004 || Kitt Peak || Spacewatch ||  || align=right | 1.1 km || 
|-id=178 bgcolor=#fefefe
| 497178 ||  || — || October 4, 2004 || Kitt Peak || Spacewatch ||  || align=right data-sort-value="0.57" | 570 m || 
|-id=179 bgcolor=#fefefe
| 497179 ||  || — || October 4, 2004 || Kitt Peak || Spacewatch ||  || align=right data-sort-value="0.48" | 480 m || 
|-id=180 bgcolor=#E9E9E9
| 497180 ||  || — || September 7, 2004 || Kitt Peak || Spacewatch ||  || align=right | 1.2 km || 
|-id=181 bgcolor=#E9E9E9
| 497181 ||  || — || October 4, 2004 || Kitt Peak || Spacewatch ||  || align=right | 1.3 km || 
|-id=182 bgcolor=#E9E9E9
| 497182 ||  || — || October 4, 2004 || Kitt Peak || Spacewatch || ADE || align=right | 2.1 km || 
|-id=183 bgcolor=#fefefe
| 497183 ||  || — || October 5, 2004 || Kitt Peak || Spacewatch ||  || align=right data-sort-value="0.54" | 540 m || 
|-id=184 bgcolor=#E9E9E9
| 497184 ||  || — || October 5, 2004 || Kitt Peak || Spacewatch ||  || align=right | 1.0 km || 
|-id=185 bgcolor=#E9E9E9
| 497185 ||  || — || October 5, 2004 || Anderson Mesa || LONEOS ||  || align=right | 1.3 km || 
|-id=186 bgcolor=#fefefe
| 497186 ||  || — || October 6, 2004 || Kitt Peak || Spacewatch ||  || align=right data-sort-value="0.57" | 570 m || 
|-id=187 bgcolor=#E9E9E9
| 497187 ||  || — || September 10, 2004 || Kitt Peak || Spacewatch ||  || align=right | 1.4 km || 
|-id=188 bgcolor=#E9E9E9
| 497188 ||  || — || September 17, 2004 || Socorro || LINEAR ||  || align=right | 1.9 km || 
|-id=189 bgcolor=#E9E9E9
| 497189 ||  || — || October 7, 2004 || Kitt Peak || Spacewatch ||  || align=right | 1.3 km || 
|-id=190 bgcolor=#E9E9E9
| 497190 ||  || — || October 8, 2004 || Anderson Mesa || LONEOS ||  || align=right | 1.3 km || 
|-id=191 bgcolor=#E9E9E9
| 497191 ||  || — || September 10, 2004 || Kitt Peak || Spacewatch ||  || align=right | 1.7 km || 
|-id=192 bgcolor=#E9E9E9
| 497192 ||  || — || October 6, 2004 || Kitt Peak || Spacewatch ||  || align=right | 1.2 km || 
|-id=193 bgcolor=#fefefe
| 497193 ||  || — || October 6, 2004 || Kitt Peak || Spacewatch ||  || align=right data-sort-value="0.55" | 550 m || 
|-id=194 bgcolor=#E9E9E9
| 497194 ||  || — || October 6, 2004 || Kitt Peak || Spacewatch || LEO || align=right | 1.4 km || 
|-id=195 bgcolor=#E9E9E9
| 497195 ||  || — || October 7, 2004 || Kitt Peak || Spacewatch ||  || align=right | 1.1 km || 
|-id=196 bgcolor=#fefefe
| 497196 ||  || — || September 10, 2004 || Kitt Peak || Spacewatch ||  || align=right data-sort-value="0.64" | 640 m || 
|-id=197 bgcolor=#E9E9E9
| 497197 ||  || — || October 7, 2004 || Kitt Peak || Spacewatch ||  || align=right | 1.8 km || 
|-id=198 bgcolor=#E9E9E9
| 497198 ||  || — || October 7, 2004 || Anderson Mesa || LONEOS ||  || align=right | 1.4 km || 
|-id=199 bgcolor=#E9E9E9
| 497199 ||  || — || September 24, 2004 || Kitt Peak || Spacewatch ||  || align=right | 1.2 km || 
|-id=200 bgcolor=#E9E9E9
| 497200 ||  || — || September 17, 2004 || Kitt Peak || Spacewatch ||  || align=right | 1.3 km || 
|}

497201–497300 

|-bgcolor=#E9E9E9
| 497201 ||  || — || October 9, 2004 || Kitt Peak || Spacewatch ||  || align=right | 1.3 km || 
|-id=202 bgcolor=#E9E9E9
| 497202 ||  || — || October 9, 2004 || Kitt Peak || Spacewatch ||  || align=right | 1.3 km || 
|-id=203 bgcolor=#E9E9E9
| 497203 ||  || — || October 9, 2004 || Kitt Peak || Spacewatch ||  || align=right | 1.7 km || 
|-id=204 bgcolor=#E9E9E9
| 497204 ||  || — || October 9, 2004 || Kitt Peak || Spacewatch || MIS || align=right | 1.0 km || 
|-id=205 bgcolor=#FA8072
| 497205 ||  || — || September 21, 2004 || Anderson Mesa || LONEOS ||  || align=right data-sort-value="0.71" | 710 m || 
|-id=206 bgcolor=#E9E9E9
| 497206 ||  || — || October 10, 2004 || Socorro || LINEAR || ADE || align=right | 2.2 km || 
|-id=207 bgcolor=#E9E9E9
| 497207 ||  || — || October 7, 2004 || Anderson Mesa || LONEOS ||  || align=right | 1.2 km || 
|-id=208 bgcolor=#E9E9E9
| 497208 ||  || — || November 4, 2004 || Catalina || CSS ||  || align=right | 1.5 km || 
|-id=209 bgcolor=#E9E9E9
| 497209 ||  || — || October 10, 2004 || Kitt Peak || Spacewatch ||  || align=right | 1.5 km || 
|-id=210 bgcolor=#E9E9E9
| 497210 ||  || — || October 14, 2004 || Kitt Peak || Spacewatch ||  || align=right | 1.8 km || 
|-id=211 bgcolor=#E9E9E9
| 497211 ||  || — || October 15, 2004 || Kitt Peak || Spacewatch ||  || align=right | 2.0 km || 
|-id=212 bgcolor=#E9E9E9
| 497212 ||  || — || November 10, 2004 || Kitt Peak || Spacewatch || AGN || align=right | 1.8 km || 
|-id=213 bgcolor=#E9E9E9
| 497213 ||  || — || November 12, 2004 || Catalina || CSS ||  || align=right | 1.6 km || 
|-id=214 bgcolor=#E9E9E9
| 497214 ||  || — || November 13, 2004 || Catalina || CSS ||  || align=right | 2.5 km || 
|-id=215 bgcolor=#E9E9E9
| 497215 ||  || — || November 3, 2004 || Palomar || NEAT ||  || align=right | 1.5 km || 
|-id=216 bgcolor=#E9E9E9
| 497216 ||  || — || November 4, 2004 || Kitt Peak || Spacewatch || JUN || align=right | 1.1 km || 
|-id=217 bgcolor=#fefefe
| 497217 ||  || — || December 11, 2004 || Kitt Peak || Spacewatch ||  || align=right data-sort-value="0.62" | 620 m || 
|-id=218 bgcolor=#fefefe
| 497218 ||  || — || December 14, 2004 || Catalina || CSS || H || align=right data-sort-value="0.59" | 590 m || 
|-id=219 bgcolor=#E9E9E9
| 497219 ||  || — || November 10, 2004 || Kitt Peak || Spacewatch ||  || align=right | 2.3 km || 
|-id=220 bgcolor=#E9E9E9
| 497220 ||  || — || November 3, 2004 || Catalina || CSS ||  || align=right | 2.5 km || 
|-id=221 bgcolor=#E9E9E9
| 497221 ||  || — || December 15, 2004 || Socorro || LINEAR || JUN || align=right | 1.2 km || 
|-id=222 bgcolor=#E9E9E9
| 497222 ||  || — || December 9, 2004 || Kitt Peak || Spacewatch ||  || align=right | 1.8 km || 
|-id=223 bgcolor=#E9E9E9
| 497223 ||  || — || December 18, 2004 || Mount Lemmon || Mount Lemmon Survey ||  || align=right | 1.9 km || 
|-id=224 bgcolor=#fefefe
| 497224 ||  || — || January 6, 2005 || Socorro || LINEAR || PHO || align=right data-sort-value="0.77" | 770 m || 
|-id=225 bgcolor=#E9E9E9
| 497225 ||  || — || January 6, 2005 || Socorro || LINEAR ||  || align=right | 2.2 km || 
|-id=226 bgcolor=#E9E9E9
| 497226 ||  || — || December 15, 2004 || Socorro || LINEAR ||  || align=right | 2.7 km || 
|-id=227 bgcolor=#fefefe
| 497227 ||  || — || January 13, 2005 || Socorro || LINEAR || H || align=right data-sort-value="0.93" | 930 m || 
|-id=228 bgcolor=#fefefe
| 497228 ||  || — || January 7, 2005 || Kitt Peak || Spacewatch ||  || align=right data-sort-value="0.55" | 550 m || 
|-id=229 bgcolor=#E9E9E9
| 497229 ||  || — || December 20, 2004 || Mount Lemmon || Mount Lemmon Survey || AEO || align=right data-sort-value="0.85" | 850 m || 
|-id=230 bgcolor=#FA8072
| 497230 ||  || — || February 4, 2005 || Mount Lemmon || Mount Lemmon Survey ||  || align=right data-sort-value="0.71" | 710 m || 
|-id=231 bgcolor=#fefefe
| 497231 ||  || — || February 1, 2005 || Kitt Peak || Spacewatch ||  || align=right data-sort-value="0.79" | 790 m || 
|-id=232 bgcolor=#FFC2E0
| 497232 ||  || — || March 1, 2005 || Catalina || CSS || APO || align=right data-sort-value="0.26" | 260 m || 
|-id=233 bgcolor=#fefefe
| 497233 ||  || — || March 3, 2005 || Kitt Peak || Spacewatch ||  || align=right data-sort-value="0.72" | 720 m || 
|-id=234 bgcolor=#fefefe
| 497234 ||  || — || March 3, 2005 || Kitt Peak || Spacewatch || NYS || align=right data-sort-value="0.71" | 710 m || 
|-id=235 bgcolor=#fefefe
| 497235 ||  || — || February 3, 2005 || Socorro || LINEAR ||  || align=right data-sort-value="0.79" | 790 m || 
|-id=236 bgcolor=#FFC2E0
| 497236 ||  || — || March 9, 2005 || Mount Lemmon || Mount Lemmon Survey || AMO || align=right data-sort-value="0.54" | 540 m || 
|-id=237 bgcolor=#fefefe
| 497237 ||  || — || March 3, 2005 || Catalina || CSS ||  || align=right data-sort-value="0.67" | 670 m || 
|-id=238 bgcolor=#fefefe
| 497238 ||  || — || March 4, 2005 || Mount Lemmon || Mount Lemmon Survey ||  || align=right data-sort-value="0.69" | 690 m || 
|-id=239 bgcolor=#fefefe
| 497239 ||  || — || March 11, 2005 || Kitt Peak || Spacewatch || V || align=right data-sort-value="0.50" | 500 m || 
|-id=240 bgcolor=#d6d6d6
| 497240 ||  || — || March 8, 2005 || Kitt Peak || Spacewatch ||  || align=right | 3.0 km || 
|-id=241 bgcolor=#fefefe
| 497241 ||  || — || March 11, 2005 || Mount Lemmon || Mount Lemmon Survey || V || align=right data-sort-value="0.55" | 550 m || 
|-id=242 bgcolor=#d6d6d6
| 497242 ||  || — || March 11, 2005 || Kitt Peak || Spacewatch ||  || align=right | 2.7 km || 
|-id=243 bgcolor=#d6d6d6
| 497243 ||  || — || February 14, 2005 || Catalina || CSS ||  || align=right | 2.6 km || 
|-id=244 bgcolor=#fefefe
| 497244 ||  || — || March 3, 2005 || Kitt Peak || Spacewatch || H || align=right data-sort-value="0.65" | 650 m || 
|-id=245 bgcolor=#FFC2E0
| 497245 ||  || — || March 16, 2005 || Catalina || CSS || APO +1km || align=right | 1.2 km || 
|-id=246 bgcolor=#d6d6d6
| 497246 ||  || — || April 2, 2005 || Mount Lemmon || Mount Lemmon Survey || EOS || align=right | 1.6 km || 
|-id=247 bgcolor=#fefefe
| 497247 ||  || — || April 2, 2005 || Mount Lemmon || Mount Lemmon Survey ||  || align=right data-sort-value="0.64" | 640 m || 
|-id=248 bgcolor=#fefefe
| 497248 ||  || — || March 11, 2005 || Mount Lemmon || Mount Lemmon Survey || NYS || align=right data-sort-value="0.48" | 480 m || 
|-id=249 bgcolor=#d6d6d6
| 497249 ||  || — || March 16, 2005 || Mount Lemmon || Mount Lemmon Survey ||  || align=right | 2.4 km || 
|-id=250 bgcolor=#fefefe
| 497250 ||  || — || April 10, 2005 || Kitt Peak || Spacewatch || NYS || align=right data-sort-value="0.53" | 530 m || 
|-id=251 bgcolor=#d6d6d6
| 497251 ||  || — || April 10, 2005 || Kitt Peak || Spacewatch ||  || align=right | 3.4 km || 
|-id=252 bgcolor=#fefefe
| 497252 ||  || — || April 12, 2005 || Kitt Peak || Spacewatch ||  || align=right data-sort-value="0.87" | 870 m || 
|-id=253 bgcolor=#d6d6d6
| 497253 ||  || — || April 7, 2005 || Anderson Mesa || LONEOS || EUP || align=right | 3.9 km || 
|-id=254 bgcolor=#d6d6d6
| 497254 ||  || — || April 4, 2005 || Mount Lemmon || Mount Lemmon Survey || EOS || align=right | 1.5 km || 
|-id=255 bgcolor=#fefefe
| 497255 ||  || — || April 4, 2005 || Mount Lemmon || Mount Lemmon Survey ||  || align=right data-sort-value="0.71" | 710 m || 
|-id=256 bgcolor=#d6d6d6
| 497256 ||  || — || April 9, 2005 || Calvin-Rehoboth || Calvin–Rehoboth Obs. ||  || align=right | 2.1 km || 
|-id=257 bgcolor=#FA8072
| 497257 ||  || — || March 12, 2005 || Mount Lemmon || Mount Lemmon Survey || Tj (2.91) || align=right | 3.2 km || 
|-id=258 bgcolor=#d6d6d6
| 497258 ||  || — || April 2, 2005 || Mount Lemmon || Mount Lemmon Survey ||  || align=right | 1.9 km || 
|-id=259 bgcolor=#d6d6d6
| 497259 ||  || — || March 10, 2005 || Mount Lemmon || Mount Lemmon Survey ||  || align=right | 1.7 km || 
|-id=260 bgcolor=#d6d6d6
| 497260 ||  || — || May 4, 2005 || Catalina || CSS ||  || align=right | 3.2 km || 
|-id=261 bgcolor=#d6d6d6
| 497261 ||  || — || May 7, 2005 || Mount Lemmon || Mount Lemmon Survey ||  || align=right | 3.6 km || 
|-id=262 bgcolor=#d6d6d6
| 497262 ||  || — || May 8, 2005 || Kitt Peak || Spacewatch ||  || align=right | 2.7 km || 
|-id=263 bgcolor=#d6d6d6
| 497263 ||  || — || May 8, 2005 || Kitt Peak || Spacewatch ||  || align=right | 2.6 km || 
|-id=264 bgcolor=#fefefe
| 497264 ||  || — || May 3, 2005 || Kitt Peak || Spacewatch || MAS || align=right data-sort-value="0.64" | 640 m || 
|-id=265 bgcolor=#d6d6d6
| 497265 ||  || — || May 10, 2005 || Kitt Peak || Spacewatch || Tj (2.99) || align=right | 2.4 km || 
|-id=266 bgcolor=#fefefe
| 497266 ||  || — || May 4, 2005 || Mount Lemmon || Mount Lemmon Survey ||  || align=right data-sort-value="0.71" | 710 m || 
|-id=267 bgcolor=#fefefe
| 497267 ||  || — || May 10, 2005 || Cerro Tololo || M. W. Buie ||  || align=right data-sort-value="0.63" | 630 m || 
|-id=268 bgcolor=#d6d6d6
| 497268 ||  || — || May 11, 2005 || Cerro Tololo || M. W. Buie ||  || align=right | 2.7 km || 
|-id=269 bgcolor=#fefefe
| 497269 ||  || — || May 4, 2005 || Kitt Peak || Spacewatch ||  || align=right | 1.1 km || 
|-id=270 bgcolor=#d6d6d6
| 497270 ||  || — || June 27, 2005 || Kitt Peak || Spacewatch ||  || align=right | 4.0 km || 
|-id=271 bgcolor=#d6d6d6
| 497271 ||  || — || July 1, 2005 || Kitt Peak || Spacewatch ||  || align=right | 3.1 km || 
|-id=272 bgcolor=#fefefe
| 497272 ||  || — || July 3, 2005 || Mount Lemmon || Mount Lemmon Survey ||  || align=right data-sort-value="0.89" | 890 m || 
|-id=273 bgcolor=#fefefe
| 497273 ||  || — || July 5, 2005 || Kitt Peak || Spacewatch ||  || align=right data-sort-value="0.66" | 660 m || 
|-id=274 bgcolor=#d6d6d6
| 497274 ||  || — || July 10, 2005 || Kitt Peak || Spacewatch ||  || align=right | 2.7 km || 
|-id=275 bgcolor=#d6d6d6
| 497275 ||  || — || July 7, 2005 || Mauna Kea || C. Veillet ||  || align=right | 2.9 km || 
|-id=276 bgcolor=#d6d6d6
| 497276 ||  || — || July 30, 2005 || Palomar || NEAT ||  || align=right | 3.7 km || 
|-id=277 bgcolor=#E9E9E9
| 497277 ||  || — || August 26, 2005 || Anderson Mesa || LONEOS ||  || align=right data-sort-value="0.88" | 880 m || 
|-id=278 bgcolor=#E9E9E9
| 497278 ||  || — || August 25, 2005 || Palomar || NEAT ||  || align=right data-sort-value="0.91" | 910 m || 
|-id=279 bgcolor=#E9E9E9
| 497279 ||  || — || August 28, 2005 || Kitt Peak || Spacewatch ||  || align=right data-sort-value="0.90" | 900 m || 
|-id=280 bgcolor=#fefefe
| 497280 ||  || — || August 28, 2005 || Kitt Peak || Spacewatch ||  || align=right data-sort-value="0.76" | 760 m || 
|-id=281 bgcolor=#E9E9E9
| 497281 ||  || — || August 28, 2005 || Kitt Peak || Spacewatch ||  || align=right data-sort-value="0.54" | 540 m || 
|-id=282 bgcolor=#E9E9E9
| 497282 ||  || — || August 28, 2005 || Siding Spring || SSS ||  || align=right data-sort-value="0.97" | 970 m || 
|-id=283 bgcolor=#d6d6d6
| 497283 ||  || — || August 29, 2005 || Kitt Peak || Spacewatch || HYG || align=right | 2.5 km || 
|-id=284 bgcolor=#E9E9E9
| 497284 ||  || — || September 22, 2005 || Uccle || T. Pauwels ||  || align=right data-sort-value="0.78" | 780 m || 
|-id=285 bgcolor=#E9E9E9
| 497285 ||  || — || September 23, 2005 || Kitt Peak || Spacewatch ||  || align=right data-sort-value="0.97" | 970 m || 
|-id=286 bgcolor=#E9E9E9
| 497286 ||  || — || September 27, 2005 || Kitt Peak || Spacewatch ||  || align=right data-sort-value="0.77" | 770 m || 
|-id=287 bgcolor=#E9E9E9
| 497287 ||  || — || September 25, 2005 || Kitt Peak || Spacewatch ||  || align=right data-sort-value="0.62" | 620 m || 
|-id=288 bgcolor=#E9E9E9
| 497288 ||  || — || September 26, 2005 || Kitt Peak || Spacewatch ||  || align=right data-sort-value="0.53" | 530 m || 
|-id=289 bgcolor=#E9E9E9
| 497289 ||  || — || September 24, 2005 || Kitt Peak || Spacewatch ||  || align=right data-sort-value="0.50" | 500 m || 
|-id=290 bgcolor=#E9E9E9
| 497290 ||  || — || September 24, 2005 || Kitt Peak || Spacewatch ||  || align=right data-sort-value="0.79" | 790 m || 
|-id=291 bgcolor=#E9E9E9
| 497291 ||  || — || September 24, 2005 || Kitt Peak || Spacewatch ||  || align=right data-sort-value="0.80" | 800 m || 
|-id=292 bgcolor=#E9E9E9
| 497292 ||  || — || September 24, 2005 || Kitt Peak || Spacewatch ||  || align=right data-sort-value="0.68" | 680 m || 
|-id=293 bgcolor=#E9E9E9
| 497293 ||  || — || September 25, 2005 || Kitt Peak || Spacewatch ||  || align=right data-sort-value="0.74" | 740 m || 
|-id=294 bgcolor=#E9E9E9
| 497294 ||  || — || September 26, 2005 || Kitt Peak || Spacewatch ||  || align=right data-sort-value="0.69" | 690 m || 
|-id=295 bgcolor=#E9E9E9
| 497295 ||  || — || September 26, 2005 || Kitt Peak || Spacewatch ||  || align=right data-sort-value="0.72" | 720 m || 
|-id=296 bgcolor=#E9E9E9
| 497296 ||  || — || September 29, 2005 || Kitt Peak || Spacewatch ||  || align=right data-sort-value="0.72" | 720 m || 
|-id=297 bgcolor=#E9E9E9
| 497297 ||  || — || September 30, 2005 || Mount Lemmon || Mount Lemmon Survey ||  || align=right data-sort-value="0.65" | 650 m || 
|-id=298 bgcolor=#E9E9E9
| 497298 ||  || — || September 30, 2005 || Mount Lemmon || Mount Lemmon Survey ||  || align=right data-sort-value="0.76" | 760 m || 
|-id=299 bgcolor=#E9E9E9
| 497299 ||  || — || September 30, 2005 || Mount Lemmon || Mount Lemmon Survey ||  || align=right data-sort-value="0.68" | 680 m || 
|-id=300 bgcolor=#E9E9E9
| 497300 ||  || — || September 29, 2005 || Mount Lemmon || Mount Lemmon Survey ||  || align=right data-sort-value="0.57" | 570 m || 
|}

497301–497400 

|-bgcolor=#d6d6d6
| 497301 ||  || — || September 3, 2005 || Catalina || CSS ||  || align=right | 4.2 km || 
|-id=302 bgcolor=#E9E9E9
| 497302 ||  || — || September 30, 2005 || Mount Lemmon || Mount Lemmon Survey ||  || align=right data-sort-value="0.50" | 500 m || 
|-id=303 bgcolor=#E9E9E9
| 497303 ||  || — || September 25, 2005 || Kitt Peak || Spacewatch ||  || align=right | 1.0 km || 
|-id=304 bgcolor=#E9E9E9
| 497304 ||  || — || September 29, 2005 || Kitt Peak || Spacewatch ||  || align=right data-sort-value="0.45" | 450 m || 
|-id=305 bgcolor=#E9E9E9
| 497305 ||  || — || September 27, 2005 || Kitt Peak || Spacewatch || BRG || align=right | 1.1 km || 
|-id=306 bgcolor=#E9E9E9
| 497306 ||  || — || September 27, 2005 || Apache Point || A. C. Becker ||  || align=right | 1.5 km || 
|-id=307 bgcolor=#fefefe
| 497307 ||  || — || September 25, 2005 || Kitt Peak || Spacewatch ||  || align=right data-sort-value="0.75" | 750 m || 
|-id=308 bgcolor=#E9E9E9
| 497308 ||  || — || October 1, 2005 || Mount Lemmon || Mount Lemmon Survey ||  || align=right data-sort-value="0.68" | 680 m || 
|-id=309 bgcolor=#fefefe
| 497309 ||  || — || October 4, 2005 || Mount Lemmon || Mount Lemmon Survey || critical || align=right data-sort-value="0.43" | 430 m || 
|-id=310 bgcolor=#E9E9E9
| 497310 ||  || — || October 1, 2005 || Mount Lemmon || Mount Lemmon Survey ||  || align=right data-sort-value="0.75" | 750 m || 
|-id=311 bgcolor=#E9E9E9
| 497311 ||  || — || October 4, 2005 || Mount Lemmon || Mount Lemmon Survey ||  || align=right data-sort-value="0.41" | 410 m || 
|-id=312 bgcolor=#E9E9E9
| 497312 ||  || — || October 3, 2005 || Kitt Peak || Spacewatch ||  || align=right data-sort-value="0.65" | 650 m || 
|-id=313 bgcolor=#E9E9E9
| 497313 ||  || — || September 29, 2005 || Mount Lemmon || Mount Lemmon Survey ||  || align=right data-sort-value="0.47" | 470 m || 
|-id=314 bgcolor=#E9E9E9
| 497314 ||  || — || October 6, 2005 || Mount Lemmon || Mount Lemmon Survey ||  || align=right data-sort-value="0.61" | 610 m || 
|-id=315 bgcolor=#E9E9E9
| 497315 ||  || — || October 7, 2005 || Kitt Peak || Spacewatch ||  || align=right data-sort-value="0.68" | 680 m || 
|-id=316 bgcolor=#E9E9E9
| 497316 ||  || — || October 7, 2005 || Mount Lemmon || Mount Lemmon Survey || EUN || align=right data-sort-value="0.84" | 840 m || 
|-id=317 bgcolor=#E9E9E9
| 497317 ||  || — || September 23, 2005 || Kitt Peak || Spacewatch ||  || align=right data-sort-value="0.75" | 750 m || 
|-id=318 bgcolor=#E9E9E9
| 497318 ||  || — || September 27, 2005 || Kitt Peak || Spacewatch ||  || align=right data-sort-value="0.74" | 740 m || 
|-id=319 bgcolor=#E9E9E9
| 497319 ||  || — || October 7, 2005 || Kitt Peak || Spacewatch ||  || align=right data-sort-value="0.51" | 510 m || 
|-id=320 bgcolor=#E9E9E9
| 497320 ||  || — || October 7, 2005 || Kitt Peak || Spacewatch ||  || align=right data-sort-value="0.65" | 650 m || 
|-id=321 bgcolor=#E9E9E9
| 497321 ||  || — || October 7, 2005 || Kitt Peak || Spacewatch ||  || align=right data-sort-value="0.83" | 830 m || 
|-id=322 bgcolor=#E9E9E9
| 497322 ||  || — || October 7, 2005 || Kitt Peak || Spacewatch ||  || align=right data-sort-value="0.70" | 700 m || 
|-id=323 bgcolor=#E9E9E9
| 497323 ||  || — || October 7, 2005 || Kitt Peak || Spacewatch ||  || align=right data-sort-value="0.57" | 570 m || 
|-id=324 bgcolor=#E9E9E9
| 497324 ||  || — || October 7, 2005 || Kitt Peak || Spacewatch ||  || align=right data-sort-value="0.62" | 620 m || 
|-id=325 bgcolor=#E9E9E9
| 497325 ||  || — || October 8, 2005 || Kitt Peak || Spacewatch ||  || align=right data-sort-value="0.59" | 590 m || 
|-id=326 bgcolor=#E9E9E9
| 497326 ||  || — || September 29, 2005 || Kitt Peak || Spacewatch ||  || align=right data-sort-value="0.62" | 620 m || 
|-id=327 bgcolor=#E9E9E9
| 497327 ||  || — || October 9, 2005 || Kitt Peak || Spacewatch ||  || align=right data-sort-value="0.64" | 640 m || 
|-id=328 bgcolor=#E9E9E9
| 497328 ||  || — || September 29, 2005 || Kitt Peak || Spacewatch ||  || align=right data-sort-value="0.67" | 670 m || 
|-id=329 bgcolor=#E9E9E9
| 497329 ||  || — || October 2, 2005 || Mount Lemmon || Mount Lemmon Survey ||  || align=right data-sort-value="0.66" | 660 m || 
|-id=330 bgcolor=#E9E9E9
| 497330 ||  || — || October 9, 2005 || Kitt Peak || Spacewatch || KON || align=right | 1.8 km || 
|-id=331 bgcolor=#E9E9E9
| 497331 ||  || — || October 3, 2005 || Palomar || NEAT || HNS || align=right | 1.2 km || 
|-id=332 bgcolor=#E9E9E9
| 497332 ||  || — || October 1, 2005 || Kitt Peak || Spacewatch ||  || align=right data-sort-value="0.64" | 640 m || 
|-id=333 bgcolor=#E9E9E9
| 497333 ||  || — || October 22, 2005 || Junk Bond || D. Healy ||  || align=right data-sort-value="0.67" | 670 m || 
|-id=334 bgcolor=#E9E9E9
| 497334 ||  || — || October 22, 2005 || Kitt Peak || Spacewatch ||  || align=right data-sort-value="0.72" | 720 m || 
|-id=335 bgcolor=#E9E9E9
| 497335 ||  || — || October 22, 2005 || Kitt Peak || Spacewatch ||  || align=right data-sort-value="0.65" | 650 m || 
|-id=336 bgcolor=#E9E9E9
| 497336 ||  || — || October 22, 2005 || Kitt Peak || Spacewatch ||  || align=right data-sort-value="0.64" | 640 m || 
|-id=337 bgcolor=#E9E9E9
| 497337 ||  || — || October 23, 2005 || Kitt Peak || Spacewatch ||  || align=right data-sort-value="0.75" | 750 m || 
|-id=338 bgcolor=#E9E9E9
| 497338 ||  || — || October 22, 2005 || Kitt Peak || Spacewatch ||  || align=right data-sort-value="0.57" | 570 m || 
|-id=339 bgcolor=#E9E9E9
| 497339 ||  || — || October 23, 2005 || Catalina || CSS ||  || align=right data-sort-value="0.64" | 640 m || 
|-id=340 bgcolor=#E9E9E9
| 497340 ||  || — || October 25, 2005 || Kitt Peak || Spacewatch ||  || align=right data-sort-value="0.82" | 820 m || 
|-id=341 bgcolor=#E9E9E9
| 497341 ||  || — || October 22, 2005 || Kitt Peak || Spacewatch ||  || align=right data-sort-value="0.70" | 700 m || 
|-id=342 bgcolor=#E9E9E9
| 497342 ||  || — || October 22, 2005 || Kitt Peak || Spacewatch || HNS || align=right data-sort-value="0.86" | 860 m || 
|-id=343 bgcolor=#E9E9E9
| 497343 ||  || — || October 22, 2005 || Kitt Peak || Spacewatch || MIS || align=right | 1.3 km || 
|-id=344 bgcolor=#E9E9E9
| 497344 ||  || — || October 22, 2005 || Kitt Peak || Spacewatch ||  || align=right data-sort-value="0.84" | 840 m || 
|-id=345 bgcolor=#E9E9E9
| 497345 ||  || — || October 24, 2005 || Kitt Peak || Spacewatch ||  || align=right data-sort-value="0.69" | 690 m || 
|-id=346 bgcolor=#E9E9E9
| 497346 ||  || — || October 24, 2005 || Kitt Peak || Spacewatch ||  || align=right data-sort-value="0.70" | 700 m || 
|-id=347 bgcolor=#E9E9E9
| 497347 ||  || — || October 25, 2005 || Kitt Peak || Spacewatch ||  || align=right data-sort-value="0.49" | 490 m || 
|-id=348 bgcolor=#E9E9E9
| 497348 ||  || — || October 1, 2005 || Mount Lemmon || Mount Lemmon Survey ||  || align=right data-sort-value="0.83" | 830 m || 
|-id=349 bgcolor=#E9E9E9
| 497349 ||  || — || October 24, 2005 || Kitt Peak || Spacewatch ||  || align=right data-sort-value="0.83" | 830 m || 
|-id=350 bgcolor=#E9E9E9
| 497350 ||  || — || October 24, 2005 || Kitt Peak || Spacewatch ||  || align=right data-sort-value="0.67" | 670 m || 
|-id=351 bgcolor=#E9E9E9
| 497351 ||  || — || October 24, 2005 || Kitt Peak || Spacewatch ||  || align=right | 1.5 km || 
|-id=352 bgcolor=#E9E9E9
| 497352 ||  || — || October 24, 2005 || Kitt Peak || Spacewatch ||  || align=right | 3.3 km || 
|-id=353 bgcolor=#E9E9E9
| 497353 ||  || — || October 25, 2005 || Kitt Peak || Spacewatch ||  || align=right data-sort-value="0.72" | 720 m || 
|-id=354 bgcolor=#E9E9E9
| 497354 ||  || — || October 25, 2005 || Mount Lemmon || Mount Lemmon Survey ||  || align=right data-sort-value="0.78" | 780 m || 
|-id=355 bgcolor=#E9E9E9
| 497355 ||  || — || October 26, 2005 || Kitt Peak || Spacewatch ||  || align=right data-sort-value="0.62" | 620 m || 
|-id=356 bgcolor=#E9E9E9
| 497356 ||  || — || October 27, 2005 || Mount Lemmon || Mount Lemmon Survey || KON || align=right | 2.0 km || 
|-id=357 bgcolor=#E9E9E9
| 497357 ||  || — || October 25, 2005 || Kitt Peak || Spacewatch ||  || align=right data-sort-value="0.61" | 610 m || 
|-id=358 bgcolor=#E9E9E9
| 497358 ||  || — || October 25, 2005 || Kitt Peak || Spacewatch ||  || align=right data-sort-value="0.75" | 750 m || 
|-id=359 bgcolor=#E9E9E9
| 497359 ||  || — || October 25, 2005 || Kitt Peak || Spacewatch ||  || align=right data-sort-value="0.82" | 820 m || 
|-id=360 bgcolor=#E9E9E9
| 497360 ||  || — || October 25, 2005 || Kitt Peak || Spacewatch ||  || align=right data-sort-value="0.73" | 730 m || 
|-id=361 bgcolor=#E9E9E9
| 497361 ||  || — || October 25, 2005 || Kitt Peak || Spacewatch ||  || align=right data-sort-value="0.61" | 610 m || 
|-id=362 bgcolor=#E9E9E9
| 497362 ||  || — || October 28, 2005 || Mount Lemmon || Mount Lemmon Survey ||  || align=right data-sort-value="0.66" | 660 m || 
|-id=363 bgcolor=#E9E9E9
| 497363 ||  || — || October 25, 2005 || Kitt Peak || Spacewatch ||  || align=right data-sort-value="0.60" | 600 m || 
|-id=364 bgcolor=#E9E9E9
| 497364 ||  || — || October 25, 2005 || Kitt Peak || Spacewatch ||  || align=right | 1.3 km || 
|-id=365 bgcolor=#E9E9E9
| 497365 ||  || — || October 25, 2005 || Mount Lemmon || Mount Lemmon Survey ||  || align=right data-sort-value="0.93" | 930 m || 
|-id=366 bgcolor=#E9E9E9
| 497366 ||  || — || October 24, 2005 || Kitt Peak || Spacewatch ||  || align=right data-sort-value="0.67" | 670 m || 
|-id=367 bgcolor=#E9E9E9
| 497367 ||  || — || October 25, 2005 || Mount Lemmon || Mount Lemmon Survey || KON || align=right | 1.9 km || 
|-id=368 bgcolor=#E9E9E9
| 497368 ||  || — || October 26, 2005 || Kitt Peak || Spacewatch || (5) || align=right data-sort-value="0.76" | 760 m || 
|-id=369 bgcolor=#E9E9E9
| 497369 ||  || — || October 27, 2005 || Mount Lemmon || Mount Lemmon Survey || AGN || align=right data-sort-value="0.96" | 960 m || 
|-id=370 bgcolor=#E9E9E9
| 497370 ||  || — || October 27, 2005 || Kitt Peak || Spacewatch ||  || align=right data-sort-value="0.90" | 900 m || 
|-id=371 bgcolor=#E9E9E9
| 497371 ||  || — || October 27, 2005 || Kitt Peak || Spacewatch ||  || align=right data-sort-value="0.75" | 750 m || 
|-id=372 bgcolor=#E9E9E9
| 497372 ||  || — || October 29, 2005 || Kitt Peak || Spacewatch || (5) || align=right data-sort-value="0.55" | 550 m || 
|-id=373 bgcolor=#E9E9E9
| 497373 ||  || — || October 29, 2005 || Mount Lemmon || Mount Lemmon Survey || EUN || align=right data-sort-value="0.96" | 960 m || 
|-id=374 bgcolor=#E9E9E9
| 497374 ||  || — || September 30, 2005 || Mount Lemmon || Mount Lemmon Survey ||  || align=right data-sort-value="0.63" | 630 m || 
|-id=375 bgcolor=#E9E9E9
| 497375 ||  || — || October 27, 2005 || Kitt Peak || Spacewatch ||  || align=right | 1.1 km || 
|-id=376 bgcolor=#E9E9E9
| 497376 ||  || — || October 27, 2005 || Mount Lemmon || Mount Lemmon Survey ||  || align=right data-sort-value="0.62" | 620 m || 
|-id=377 bgcolor=#E9E9E9
| 497377 ||  || — || October 25, 2005 || Kitt Peak || Spacewatch ||  || align=right data-sort-value="0.84" | 840 m || 
|-id=378 bgcolor=#E9E9E9
| 497378 ||  || — || October 28, 2005 || Kitt Peak || Spacewatch ||  || align=right data-sort-value="0.57" | 570 m || 
|-id=379 bgcolor=#E9E9E9
| 497379 ||  || — || October 28, 2005 || Kitt Peak || Spacewatch ||  || align=right data-sort-value="0.76" | 760 m || 
|-id=380 bgcolor=#E9E9E9
| 497380 ||  || — || October 28, 2005 || Kitt Peak || Spacewatch ||  || align=right data-sort-value="0.57" | 570 m || 
|-id=381 bgcolor=#d6d6d6
| 497381 ||  || — || October 29, 2005 || Mount Lemmon || Mount Lemmon Survey || SYL7:4 || align=right | 2.9 km || 
|-id=382 bgcolor=#E9E9E9
| 497382 ||  || — || October 9, 2005 || Kitt Peak || Spacewatch ||  || align=right data-sort-value="0.78" | 780 m || 
|-id=383 bgcolor=#d6d6d6
| 497383 ||  || — || October 25, 2005 || Kitt Peak || Spacewatch || THM || align=right | 2.1 km || 
|-id=384 bgcolor=#E9E9E9
| 497384 ||  || — || October 30, 2005 || Mount Lemmon || Mount Lemmon Survey ||  || align=right data-sort-value="0.81" | 810 m || 
|-id=385 bgcolor=#E9E9E9
| 497385 ||  || — || October 28, 2005 || Mount Lemmon || Mount Lemmon Survey ||  || align=right data-sort-value="0.87" | 870 m || 
|-id=386 bgcolor=#E9E9E9
| 497386 ||  || — || October 30, 2005 || Mount Lemmon || Mount Lemmon Survey ||  || align=right data-sort-value="0.92" | 920 m || 
|-id=387 bgcolor=#E9E9E9
| 497387 ||  || — || November 1, 2005 || Kitt Peak || Spacewatch ||  || align=right data-sort-value="0.72" | 720 m || 
|-id=388 bgcolor=#E9E9E9
| 497388 ||  || — || November 1, 2005 || Kitt Peak || Spacewatch ||  || align=right data-sort-value="0.62" | 620 m || 
|-id=389 bgcolor=#E9E9E9
| 497389 ||  || — || November 2, 2005 || Mount Lemmon || Mount Lemmon Survey ||  || align=right data-sort-value="0.73" | 730 m || 
|-id=390 bgcolor=#E9E9E9
| 497390 ||  || — || November 5, 2005 || Kitt Peak || Spacewatch ||  || align=right data-sort-value="0.62" | 620 m || 
|-id=391 bgcolor=#E9E9E9
| 497391 ||  || — || October 25, 2005 || Mount Lemmon || Mount Lemmon Survey || EUN || align=right | 1.7 km || 
|-id=392 bgcolor=#E9E9E9
| 497392 ||  || — || October 25, 2005 || Kitt Peak || Spacewatch || KON || align=right data-sort-value="0.62" | 620 m || 
|-id=393 bgcolor=#E9E9E9
| 497393 ||  || — || November 6, 2005 || Kitt Peak || Spacewatch ||  || align=right data-sort-value="0.85" | 850 m || 
|-id=394 bgcolor=#E9E9E9
| 497394 ||  || — || November 2, 2005 || Catalina || CSS ||  || align=right data-sort-value="0.90" | 900 m || 
|-id=395 bgcolor=#E9E9E9
| 497395 ||  || — || November 6, 2005 || Mount Lemmon || Mount Lemmon Survey ||  || align=right data-sort-value="0.76" | 760 m || 
|-id=396 bgcolor=#E9E9E9
| 497396 ||  || — || November 10, 2005 || Campo Imperatore || CINEOS ||  || align=right | 1.7 km || 
|-id=397 bgcolor=#E9E9E9
| 497397 ||  || — || November 11, 2005 || Kitt Peak || Spacewatch ||  || align=right data-sort-value="0.65" | 650 m || 
|-id=398 bgcolor=#E9E9E9
| 497398 ||  || — || November 14, 2005 || Palomar || NEAT ||  || align=right | 2.8 km || 
|-id=399 bgcolor=#E9E9E9
| 497399 ||  || — || November 10, 2005 || Mount Lemmon || Mount Lemmon Survey || EUN || align=right | 1.1 km || 
|-id=400 bgcolor=#E9E9E9
| 497400 ||  || — || September 23, 2005 || Kitt Peak || Spacewatch ||  || align=right data-sort-value="0.60" | 600 m || 
|}

497401–497500 

|-bgcolor=#E9E9E9
| 497401 ||  || — || November 10, 2005 || Kitt Peak || Spacewatch ||  || align=right | 1.4 km || 
|-id=402 bgcolor=#E9E9E9
| 497402 ||  || — || November 25, 2005 || Mount Lemmon || Mount Lemmon Survey || BAR || align=right | 1.8 km || 
|-id=403 bgcolor=#E9E9E9
| 497403 ||  || — || November 21, 2005 || Kitt Peak || Spacewatch || HNS || align=right | 1.2 km || 
|-id=404 bgcolor=#E9E9E9
| 497404 ||  || — || November 3, 2005 || Kitt Peak || Spacewatch || MAR || align=right data-sort-value="0.86" | 860 m || 
|-id=405 bgcolor=#E9E9E9
| 497405 ||  || — || November 22, 2005 || Kitt Peak || Spacewatch ||  || align=right | 1.6 km || 
|-id=406 bgcolor=#E9E9E9
| 497406 ||  || — || November 21, 2005 || Kitt Peak || Spacewatch ||  || align=right data-sort-value="0.82" | 820 m || 
|-id=407 bgcolor=#E9E9E9
| 497407 ||  || — || November 21, 2005 || Catalina || CSS || EUN || align=right | 1.1 km || 
|-id=408 bgcolor=#E9E9E9
| 497408 ||  || — || November 22, 2005 || Kitt Peak || Spacewatch ||  || align=right data-sort-value="0.81" | 810 m || 
|-id=409 bgcolor=#E9E9E9
| 497409 ||  || — || November 25, 2005 || Kitt Peak || Spacewatch ||  || align=right data-sort-value="0.71" | 710 m || 
|-id=410 bgcolor=#E9E9E9
| 497410 ||  || — || November 25, 2005 || Kitt Peak || Spacewatch || KON || align=right data-sort-value="0.69" | 690 m || 
|-id=411 bgcolor=#E9E9E9
| 497411 ||  || — || November 25, 2005 || Mount Lemmon || Mount Lemmon Survey ||  || align=right | 1.1 km || 
|-id=412 bgcolor=#E9E9E9
| 497412 ||  || — || November 25, 2005 || Mount Lemmon || Mount Lemmon Survey ||  || align=right data-sort-value="0.71" | 710 m || 
|-id=413 bgcolor=#E9E9E9
| 497413 ||  || — || November 25, 2005 || Kitt Peak || Spacewatch ||  || align=right data-sort-value="0.79" | 790 m || 
|-id=414 bgcolor=#E9E9E9
| 497414 ||  || — || November 26, 2005 || Mount Lemmon || Mount Lemmon Survey ||  || align=right data-sort-value="0.92" | 920 m || 
|-id=415 bgcolor=#E9E9E9
| 497415 ||  || — || November 28, 2005 || Socorro || LINEAR || IAN || align=right | 1.6 km || 
|-id=416 bgcolor=#E9E9E9
| 497416 ||  || — || November 29, 2005 || Catalina || CSS ||  || align=right | 1.1 km || 
|-id=417 bgcolor=#E9E9E9
| 497417 ||  || — || November 28, 2005 || Kitt Peak || Spacewatch || KON || align=right | 2.2 km || 
|-id=418 bgcolor=#E9E9E9
| 497418 ||  || — || November 25, 2005 || Kitt Peak || Spacewatch ||  || align=right | 1.2 km || 
|-id=419 bgcolor=#E9E9E9
| 497419 ||  || — || November 25, 2005 || Mount Lemmon || Mount Lemmon Survey ||  || align=right data-sort-value="0.96" | 960 m || 
|-id=420 bgcolor=#E9E9E9
| 497420 ||  || — || November 26, 2005 || Mount Lemmon || Mount Lemmon Survey ||  || align=right data-sort-value="0.53" | 530 m || 
|-id=421 bgcolor=#E9E9E9
| 497421 ||  || — || November 28, 2005 || Kitt Peak || Spacewatch ||  || align=right data-sort-value="0.86" | 860 m || 
|-id=422 bgcolor=#E9E9E9
| 497422 ||  || — || November 29, 2005 || Socorro || LINEAR ||  || align=right | 1.0 km || 
|-id=423 bgcolor=#E9E9E9
| 497423 ||  || — || November 29, 2005 || Kitt Peak || Spacewatch ||  || align=right data-sort-value="0.81" | 810 m || 
|-id=424 bgcolor=#E9E9E9
| 497424 ||  || — || November 30, 2005 || Kitt Peak || Spacewatch ||  || align=right data-sort-value="0.85" | 850 m || 
|-id=425 bgcolor=#E9E9E9
| 497425 ||  || — || December 1, 2005 || Mount Lemmon || Mount Lemmon Survey ||  || align=right data-sort-value="0.71" | 710 m || 
|-id=426 bgcolor=#E9E9E9
| 497426 ||  || — || December 1, 2005 || Kitt Peak || Spacewatch ||  || align=right data-sort-value="0.67" | 670 m || 
|-id=427 bgcolor=#fefefe
| 497427 ||  || — || October 25, 2005 || Mount Lemmon || Mount Lemmon Survey ||  || align=right data-sort-value="0.60" | 600 m || 
|-id=428 bgcolor=#E9E9E9
| 497428 ||  || — || November 3, 2005 || Socorro || LINEAR ||  || align=right | 3.2 km || 
|-id=429 bgcolor=#E9E9E9
| 497429 ||  || — || December 2, 2005 || Socorro || LINEAR ||  || align=right data-sort-value="0.76" | 760 m || 
|-id=430 bgcolor=#E9E9E9
| 497430 ||  || — || December 2, 2005 || Kitt Peak || Spacewatch ||  || align=right data-sort-value="0.57" | 570 m || 
|-id=431 bgcolor=#E9E9E9
| 497431 ||  || — || December 2, 2005 || Kitt Peak || Spacewatch ||  || align=right data-sort-value="0.75" | 750 m || 
|-id=432 bgcolor=#E9E9E9
| 497432 ||  || — || December 2, 2005 || Kitt Peak || Spacewatch || EUN || align=right | 1.4 km || 
|-id=433 bgcolor=#E9E9E9
| 497433 ||  || — || December 3, 2005 || Kitt Peak || Spacewatch ||  || align=right data-sort-value="0.74" | 740 m || 
|-id=434 bgcolor=#E9E9E9
| 497434 ||  || — || December 5, 2005 || Mount Lemmon || Mount Lemmon Survey ||  || align=right data-sort-value="0.85" | 850 m || 
|-id=435 bgcolor=#E9E9E9
| 497435 ||  || — || October 29, 2005 || Mount Lemmon || Mount Lemmon Survey ||  || align=right | 1.2 km || 
|-id=436 bgcolor=#E9E9E9
| 497436 ||  || — || December 10, 2005 || Kitt Peak || Spacewatch || EUN || align=right data-sort-value="0.95" | 950 m || 
|-id=437 bgcolor=#E9E9E9
| 497437 ||  || — || December 1, 2005 || Kitt Peak || Spacewatch ||  || align=right | 1.4 km || 
|-id=438 bgcolor=#E9E9E9
| 497438 ||  || — || December 1, 2005 || Kitt Peak || M. W. Buie ||  || align=right data-sort-value="0.92" | 920 m || 
|-id=439 bgcolor=#E9E9E9
| 497439 ||  || — || December 22, 2005 || Catalina || CSS ||  || align=right | 1.1 km || 
|-id=440 bgcolor=#E9E9E9
| 497440 ||  || — || August 25, 1995 || Kitt Peak || Spacewatch ||  || align=right | 1.9 km || 
|-id=441 bgcolor=#E9E9E9
| 497441 ||  || — || December 22, 2005 || Kitt Peak || Spacewatch ||  || align=right | 1.8 km || 
|-id=442 bgcolor=#E9E9E9
| 497442 ||  || — || November 3, 2005 || Mount Lemmon || Mount Lemmon Survey ||  || align=right | 1.2 km || 
|-id=443 bgcolor=#fefefe
| 497443 ||  || — || December 7, 2005 || Kitt Peak || Spacewatch || NYS || align=right data-sort-value="0.64" | 640 m || 
|-id=444 bgcolor=#E9E9E9
| 497444 ||  || — || December 24, 2005 || Kitt Peak || Spacewatch ||  || align=right | 1.2 km || 
|-id=445 bgcolor=#E9E9E9
| 497445 ||  || — || December 24, 2005 || Kitt Peak || Spacewatch ||  || align=right data-sort-value="0.81" | 810 m || 
|-id=446 bgcolor=#E9E9E9
| 497446 ||  || — || December 24, 2005 || Kitt Peak || Spacewatch ||  || align=right | 1.2 km || 
|-id=447 bgcolor=#E9E9E9
| 497447 ||  || — || December 4, 2005 || Mount Lemmon || Mount Lemmon Survey ||  || align=right | 2.2 km || 
|-id=448 bgcolor=#fefefe
| 497448 ||  || — || December 24, 2005 || Kitt Peak || Spacewatch ||  || align=right data-sort-value="0.55" | 550 m || 
|-id=449 bgcolor=#E9E9E9
| 497449 ||  || — || December 24, 2005 || Kitt Peak || Spacewatch ||  || align=right data-sort-value="0.71" | 710 m || 
|-id=450 bgcolor=#E9E9E9
| 497450 ||  || — || December 22, 2005 || Kitt Peak || Spacewatch ||  || align=right | 2.3 km || 
|-id=451 bgcolor=#E9E9E9
| 497451 ||  || — || December 25, 2005 || Kitt Peak || Spacewatch ||  || align=right | 2.9 km || 
|-id=452 bgcolor=#E9E9E9
| 497452 ||  || — || October 27, 2005 || Mount Lemmon || Mount Lemmon Survey ||  || align=right | 1.7 km || 
|-id=453 bgcolor=#E9E9E9
| 497453 ||  || — || December 24, 2005 || Kitt Peak || Spacewatch ||  || align=right | 1.7 km || 
|-id=454 bgcolor=#E9E9E9
| 497454 ||  || — || December 26, 2005 || Mount Lemmon || Mount Lemmon Survey ||  || align=right data-sort-value="0.53" | 530 m || 
|-id=455 bgcolor=#E9E9E9
| 497455 ||  || — || December 22, 2005 || Kitt Peak || Spacewatch ||  || align=right | 1.1 km || 
|-id=456 bgcolor=#E9E9E9
| 497456 ||  || — || December 5, 2005 || Mount Lemmon || Mount Lemmon Survey || MAR || align=right | 1.3 km || 
|-id=457 bgcolor=#E9E9E9
| 497457 ||  || — || December 25, 2005 || Mount Lemmon || Mount Lemmon Survey ||  || align=right data-sort-value="0.74" | 740 m || 
|-id=458 bgcolor=#E9E9E9
| 497458 ||  || — || December 24, 2005 || Kitt Peak || Spacewatch ||  || align=right | 1.5 km || 
|-id=459 bgcolor=#E9E9E9
| 497459 ||  || — || December 24, 2005 || Kitt Peak || Spacewatch ||  || align=right | 2.0 km || 
|-id=460 bgcolor=#fefefe
| 497460 ||  || — || December 26, 2005 || Mount Lemmon || Mount Lemmon Survey ||  || align=right data-sort-value="0.56" | 560 m || 
|-id=461 bgcolor=#E9E9E9
| 497461 ||  || — || December 24, 2005 || Kitt Peak || Spacewatch ||  || align=right | 1.0 km || 
|-id=462 bgcolor=#E9E9E9
| 497462 ||  || — || December 24, 2005 || Kitt Peak || Spacewatch ||  || align=right | 2.5 km || 
|-id=463 bgcolor=#E9E9E9
| 497463 ||  || — || December 25, 2005 || Kitt Peak || Spacewatch ||  || align=right | 1.9 km || 
|-id=464 bgcolor=#fefefe
| 497464 ||  || — || December 25, 2005 || Kitt Peak || Spacewatch ||  || align=right data-sort-value="0.57" | 570 m || 
|-id=465 bgcolor=#E9E9E9
| 497465 ||  || — || December 25, 2005 || Kitt Peak || Spacewatch || JUN || align=right | 1.1 km || 
|-id=466 bgcolor=#E9E9E9
| 497466 ||  || — || December 26, 2005 || Kitt Peak || Spacewatch ||  || align=right | 2.5 km || 
|-id=467 bgcolor=#E9E9E9
| 497467 ||  || — || December 28, 2005 || Mount Lemmon || Mount Lemmon Survey ||  || align=right | 1.1 km || 
|-id=468 bgcolor=#E9E9E9
| 497468 ||  || — || December 28, 2005 || Mount Lemmon || Mount Lemmon Survey ||  || align=right | 1.4 km || 
|-id=469 bgcolor=#E9E9E9
| 497469 ||  || — || December 28, 2005 || Mount Lemmon || Mount Lemmon Survey ||  || align=right | 2.8 km || 
|-id=470 bgcolor=#E9E9E9
| 497470 ||  || — || December 29, 2005 || Mount Lemmon || Mount Lemmon Survey ||  || align=right | 2.4 km || 
|-id=471 bgcolor=#d6d6d6
| 497471 ||  || — || December 29, 2005 || Mount Lemmon || Mount Lemmon Survey || EOS || align=right | 1.4 km || 
|-id=472 bgcolor=#E9E9E9
| 497472 ||  || — || December 28, 2005 || Kitt Peak || Spacewatch ||  || align=right | 1.4 km || 
|-id=473 bgcolor=#E9E9E9
| 497473 ||  || — || December 31, 2005 || Kitt Peak || Spacewatch ||  || align=right data-sort-value="0.73" | 730 m || 
|-id=474 bgcolor=#E9E9E9
| 497474 ||  || — || December 29, 2005 || Palomar || NEAT ||  || align=right data-sort-value="0.96" | 960 m || 
|-id=475 bgcolor=#E9E9E9
| 497475 ||  || — || December 29, 2005 || Catalina || CSS ||  || align=right | 3.5 km || 
|-id=476 bgcolor=#E9E9E9
| 497476 ||  || — || December 24, 2005 || Socorro || LINEAR ||  || align=right | 1.1 km || 
|-id=477 bgcolor=#E9E9E9
| 497477 ||  || — || December 2, 2005 || Mount Lemmon || Mount Lemmon Survey ||  || align=right data-sort-value="0.96" | 960 m || 
|-id=478 bgcolor=#E9E9E9
| 497478 ||  || — || December 28, 2005 || Kitt Peak || Spacewatch ||  || align=right | 1.8 km || 
|-id=479 bgcolor=#E9E9E9
| 497479 ||  || — || December 28, 2005 || Kitt Peak || Spacewatch ||  || align=right | 1.2 km || 
|-id=480 bgcolor=#E9E9E9
| 497480 ||  || — || December 2, 2005 || Mount Lemmon || Mount Lemmon Survey ||  || align=right | 1.7 km || 
|-id=481 bgcolor=#E9E9E9
| 497481 ||  || — || December 30, 2005 || Kitt Peak || Spacewatch ||  || align=right | 1.0 km || 
|-id=482 bgcolor=#E9E9E9
| 497482 ||  || — || December 28, 2005 || Kitt Peak || Spacewatch ||  || align=right | 1.4 km || 
|-id=483 bgcolor=#FA8072
| 497483 ||  || — || December 24, 2005 || Kitt Peak || Spacewatch ||  || align=right data-sort-value="0.98" | 980 m || 
|-id=484 bgcolor=#E9E9E9
| 497484 ||  || — || December 28, 2005 || Kitt Peak || Spacewatch ||  || align=right | 1.1 km || 
|-id=485 bgcolor=#E9E9E9
| 497485 ||  || — || December 27, 2005 || Kitt Peak || Spacewatch ||  || align=right | 1.5 km || 
|-id=486 bgcolor=#E9E9E9
| 497486 ||  || — || January 2, 2006 || Socorro || LINEAR ||  || align=right | 1.7 km || 
|-id=487 bgcolor=#E9E9E9
| 497487 ||  || — || January 5, 2006 || Mount Lemmon || Mount Lemmon Survey ||  || align=right | 1.0 km || 
|-id=488 bgcolor=#E9E9E9
| 497488 ||  || — || October 6, 2005 || Mount Lemmon || Mount Lemmon Survey ||  || align=right | 2.4 km || 
|-id=489 bgcolor=#E9E9E9
| 497489 ||  || — || January 2, 2006 || Socorro || LINEAR ||  || align=right | 1.6 km || 
|-id=490 bgcolor=#E9E9E9
| 497490 ||  || — || December 22, 2005 || Kitt Peak || Spacewatch ||  || align=right | 1.2 km || 
|-id=491 bgcolor=#E9E9E9
| 497491 ||  || — || December 10, 2005 || Kitt Peak || Spacewatch ||  || align=right | 1.8 km || 
|-id=492 bgcolor=#fefefe
| 497492 ||  || — || January 5, 2006 || Mount Lemmon || Mount Lemmon Survey ||  || align=right data-sort-value="0.87" | 870 m || 
|-id=493 bgcolor=#E9E9E9
| 497493 ||  || — || January 5, 2006 || Kitt Peak || Spacewatch ||  || align=right | 1.1 km || 
|-id=494 bgcolor=#E9E9E9
| 497494 ||  || — || December 24, 2005 || Kitt Peak || Spacewatch ||  || align=right data-sort-value="0.80" | 800 m || 
|-id=495 bgcolor=#E9E9E9
| 497495 ||  || — || January 9, 2006 || Kitt Peak || Spacewatch ||  || align=right | 2.7 km || 
|-id=496 bgcolor=#E9E9E9
| 497496 ||  || — || January 6, 2006 || Mount Lemmon || Mount Lemmon Survey ||  || align=right | 1.6 km || 
|-id=497 bgcolor=#E9E9E9
| 497497 ||  || — || December 28, 2005 || Kitt Peak || Spacewatch ||  || align=right | 1.7 km || 
|-id=498 bgcolor=#E9E9E9
| 497498 ||  || — || January 7, 2006 || Kitt Peak || Spacewatch ||  || align=right | 1.5 km || 
|-id=499 bgcolor=#E9E9E9
| 497499 ||  || — || October 25, 2005 || Kitt Peak || Spacewatch ||  || align=right | 1.6 km || 
|-id=500 bgcolor=#E9E9E9
| 497500 ||  || — || December 30, 2005 || Mount Lemmon || Mount Lemmon Survey || BAR || align=right | 2.5 km || 
|}

497501–497600 

|-bgcolor=#E9E9E9
| 497501 ||  || — || January 5, 2006 || Mount Lemmon || Mount Lemmon Survey || BAR || align=right | 1.9 km || 
|-id=502 bgcolor=#E9E9E9
| 497502 ||  || — || January 7, 2006 || Mount Lemmon || Mount Lemmon Survey || (5) || align=right data-sort-value="0.93" | 930 m || 
|-id=503 bgcolor=#FA8072
| 497503 ||  || — || January 21, 2006 || Kitt Peak || Spacewatch ||  || align=right | 1.3 km || 
|-id=504 bgcolor=#FA8072
| 497504 ||  || — || January 22, 2006 || Kitt Peak || Spacewatch ||  || align=right | 1.1 km || 
|-id=505 bgcolor=#E9E9E9
| 497505 ||  || — || January 22, 2006 || Mount Lemmon || Mount Lemmon Survey ||  || align=right | 1.6 km || 
|-id=506 bgcolor=#E9E9E9
| 497506 ||  || — || January 23, 2006 || Mount Lemmon || Mount Lemmon Survey || JUN || align=right data-sort-value="0.90" | 900 m || 
|-id=507 bgcolor=#E9E9E9
| 497507 ||  || — || January 25, 2006 || Kitt Peak || Spacewatch ||  || align=right | 1.1 km || 
|-id=508 bgcolor=#E9E9E9
| 497508 ||  || — || January 25, 2006 || Kitt Peak || Spacewatch ||  || align=right | 1.6 km || 
|-id=509 bgcolor=#E9E9E9
| 497509 ||  || — || January 23, 2006 || Kitt Peak || Spacewatch || MRX || align=right | 1.7 km || 
|-id=510 bgcolor=#E9E9E9
| 497510 ||  || — || January 23, 2006 || Kitt Peak || Spacewatch || AGN || align=right | 1.4 km || 
|-id=511 bgcolor=#E9E9E9
| 497511 ||  || — || January 23, 2006 || Kitt Peak || Spacewatch ||  || align=right | 1.7 km || 
|-id=512 bgcolor=#E9E9E9
| 497512 ||  || — || January 23, 2006 || Kitt Peak || Spacewatch || MRX || align=right data-sort-value="0.84" | 840 m || 
|-id=513 bgcolor=#E9E9E9
| 497513 ||  || — || January 23, 2006 || Kitt Peak || Spacewatch ||  || align=right | 1.4 km || 
|-id=514 bgcolor=#E9E9E9
| 497514 ||  || — || January 23, 2006 || Mount Lemmon || Mount Lemmon Survey ||  || align=right | 1.1 km || 
|-id=515 bgcolor=#E9E9E9
| 497515 ||  || — || January 27, 2006 || Catalina || CSS ||  || align=right | 1.5 km || 
|-id=516 bgcolor=#fefefe
| 497516 ||  || — || January 23, 2006 || Mount Lemmon || Mount Lemmon Survey ||  || align=right data-sort-value="0.55" | 550 m || 
|-id=517 bgcolor=#E9E9E9
| 497517 ||  || — || December 24, 2005 || Kitt Peak || Spacewatch ||  || align=right | 1.1 km || 
|-id=518 bgcolor=#E9E9E9
| 497518 ||  || — || December 25, 2005 || Kitt Peak || Spacewatch ||  || align=right | 2.2 km || 
|-id=519 bgcolor=#E9E9E9
| 497519 ||  || — || December 25, 2005 || Catalina || CSS || JUN || align=right | 1.1 km || 
|-id=520 bgcolor=#d6d6d6
| 497520 ||  || — || January 26, 2006 || Kitt Peak || Spacewatch ||  || align=right | 1.9 km || 
|-id=521 bgcolor=#fefefe
| 497521 ||  || — || January 26, 2006 || Kitt Peak || Spacewatch ||  || align=right data-sort-value="0.52" | 520 m || 
|-id=522 bgcolor=#E9E9E9
| 497522 ||  || — || January 26, 2006 || Kitt Peak || Spacewatch ||  || align=right | 2.1 km || 
|-id=523 bgcolor=#E9E9E9
| 497523 ||  || — || January 28, 2006 || Mount Lemmon || Mount Lemmon Survey ||  || align=right | 1.2 km || 
|-id=524 bgcolor=#E9E9E9
| 497524 ||  || — || January 22, 2006 || Anderson Mesa || LONEOS ||  || align=right | 2.4 km || 
|-id=525 bgcolor=#fefefe
| 497525 ||  || — || January 7, 2006 || Mount Lemmon || Mount Lemmon Survey ||  || align=right data-sort-value="0.53" | 530 m || 
|-id=526 bgcolor=#E9E9E9
| 497526 ||  || — || January 26, 2006 || Mount Lemmon || Mount Lemmon Survey ||  || align=right | 1.4 km || 
|-id=527 bgcolor=#E9E9E9
| 497527 ||  || — || January 28, 2006 || Mount Lemmon || Mount Lemmon Survey ||  || align=right | 2.4 km || 
|-id=528 bgcolor=#fefefe
| 497528 ||  || — || January 30, 2006 || Kitt Peak || Spacewatch ||  || align=right data-sort-value="0.66" | 660 m || 
|-id=529 bgcolor=#fefefe
| 497529 ||  || — || January 31, 2006 || Kitt Peak || Spacewatch ||  || align=right data-sort-value="0.54" | 540 m || 
|-id=530 bgcolor=#E9E9E9
| 497530 ||  || — || January 31, 2006 || Kitt Peak || Spacewatch ||  || align=right | 1.8 km || 
|-id=531 bgcolor=#E9E9E9
| 497531 ||  || — || January 5, 2006 || Mount Lemmon || Mount Lemmon Survey || GEF || align=right | 1.3 km || 
|-id=532 bgcolor=#E9E9E9
| 497532 ||  || — || December 5, 2005 || Mount Lemmon || Mount Lemmon Survey ||  || align=right | 1.7 km || 
|-id=533 bgcolor=#E9E9E9
| 497533 ||  || — || January 23, 2006 || Kitt Peak || Spacewatch || HOF || align=right | 2.2 km || 
|-id=534 bgcolor=#fefefe
| 497534 ||  || — || January 23, 2006 || Kitt Peak || Spacewatch ||  || align=right data-sort-value="0.55" | 550 m || 
|-id=535 bgcolor=#fefefe
| 497535 ||  || — || January 21, 2006 || Mount Lemmon || Mount Lemmon Survey || H || align=right data-sort-value="0.51" | 510 m || 
|-id=536 bgcolor=#E9E9E9
| 497536 ||  || — || January 23, 2006 || Kitt Peak || Spacewatch ||  || align=right | 1.3 km || 
|-id=537 bgcolor=#E9E9E9
| 497537 ||  || — || January 4, 2006 || Kitt Peak || Spacewatch ||  || align=right | 1.0 km || 
|-id=538 bgcolor=#E9E9E9
| 497538 ||  || — || January 7, 2006 || Mount Lemmon || Mount Lemmon Survey ||  || align=right | 1.0 km || 
|-id=539 bgcolor=#E9E9E9
| 497539 ||  || — || January 23, 2006 || Mount Lemmon || Mount Lemmon Survey ||  || align=right | 1.9 km || 
|-id=540 bgcolor=#E9E9E9
| 497540 ||  || — || January 23, 2006 || Kitt Peak || Spacewatch ||  || align=right | 2.6 km || 
|-id=541 bgcolor=#fefefe
| 497541 ||  || — || February 1, 2006 || Kitt Peak || Spacewatch ||  || align=right data-sort-value="0.61" | 610 m || 
|-id=542 bgcolor=#E9E9E9
| 497542 ||  || — || February 1, 2006 || Kitt Peak || Spacewatch || BRU || align=right | 2.7 km || 
|-id=543 bgcolor=#E9E9E9
| 497543 ||  || — || January 24, 2006 || Kitt Peak || Spacewatch ||  || align=right | 1.9 km || 
|-id=544 bgcolor=#E9E9E9
| 497544 ||  || — || February 2, 2006 || Kitt Peak || Spacewatch ||  || align=right | 1.5 km || 
|-id=545 bgcolor=#E9E9E9
| 497545 ||  || — || February 4, 2006 || Kitt Peak || Spacewatch ||  || align=right | 2.2 km || 
|-id=546 bgcolor=#fefefe
| 497546 ||  || — || December 17, 2001 || Kitt Peak || Spacewatch || MAS || align=right data-sort-value="0.80" | 800 m || 
|-id=547 bgcolor=#fefefe
| 497547 ||  || — || February 7, 2006 || Mount Lemmon || Mount Lemmon Survey || H || align=right data-sort-value="0.63" | 630 m || 
|-id=548 bgcolor=#fefefe
| 497548 ||  || — || February 20, 2006 || Kitt Peak || Spacewatch ||  || align=right data-sort-value="0.71" | 710 m || 
|-id=549 bgcolor=#E9E9E9
| 497549 ||  || — || February 20, 2006 || Mount Lemmon || Mount Lemmon Survey ||  || align=right | 1.4 km || 
|-id=550 bgcolor=#E9E9E9
| 497550 ||  || — || February 20, 2006 || Kitt Peak || Spacewatch ||  || align=right | 1.3 km || 
|-id=551 bgcolor=#E9E9E9
| 497551 ||  || — || February 20, 2006 || Kitt Peak || Spacewatch ||  || align=right data-sort-value="0.84" | 840 m || 
|-id=552 bgcolor=#E9E9E9
| 497552 ||  || — || January 30, 2006 || Kitt Peak || Spacewatch ||  || align=right | 1.8 km || 
|-id=553 bgcolor=#E9E9E9
| 497553 ||  || — || February 20, 2006 || Kitt Peak || Spacewatch || PAD  WIT || align=right | 1.6 km || 
|-id=554 bgcolor=#E9E9E9
| 497554 ||  || — || February 24, 2006 || Mount Lemmon || Mount Lemmon Survey ||  || align=right | 1.8 km || 
|-id=555 bgcolor=#fefefe
| 497555 ||  || — || February 25, 2006 || Mount Lemmon || Mount Lemmon Survey ||  || align=right data-sort-value="0.49" | 490 m || 
|-id=556 bgcolor=#E9E9E9
| 497556 ||  || — || February 25, 2006 || Mount Lemmon || Mount Lemmon Survey || WIT || align=right | 1.9 km || 
|-id=557 bgcolor=#fefefe
| 497557 ||  || — || February 27, 2006 || Kitt Peak || Spacewatch ||  || align=right data-sort-value="0.70" | 700 m || 
|-id=558 bgcolor=#E9E9E9
| 497558 ||  || — || January 26, 2006 || Kitt Peak || Spacewatch ||  || align=right | 1.5 km || 
|-id=559 bgcolor=#E9E9E9
| 497559 ||  || — || January 28, 2006 || Kitt Peak || Spacewatch || DOR || align=right | 2.6 km || 
|-id=560 bgcolor=#E9E9E9
| 497560 ||  || — || February 25, 2006 || Kitt Peak || Spacewatch ||  || align=right | 1.7 km || 
|-id=561 bgcolor=#E9E9E9
| 497561 ||  || — || February 25, 2006 || Kitt Peak || Spacewatch || WIT || align=right | 2.0 km || 
|-id=562 bgcolor=#fefefe
| 497562 ||  || — || February 25, 2006 || Kitt Peak || Spacewatch ||  || align=right data-sort-value="0.57" | 570 m || 
|-id=563 bgcolor=#E9E9E9
| 497563 ||  || — || February 25, 2006 || Mount Lemmon || Mount Lemmon Survey || NEM || align=right | 1.8 km || 
|-id=564 bgcolor=#E9E9E9
| 497564 ||  || — || February 25, 2006 || Mount Lemmon || Mount Lemmon Survey ||  || align=right | 2.3 km || 
|-id=565 bgcolor=#E9E9E9
| 497565 ||  || — || February 25, 2006 || Kitt Peak || Spacewatch || AGN || align=right | 1.1 km || 
|-id=566 bgcolor=#E9E9E9
| 497566 ||  || — || February 25, 2006 || Kitt Peak || Spacewatch ||   HNA || align=right | 1.8 km || 
|-id=567 bgcolor=#E9E9E9
| 497567 ||  || — || February 27, 2006 || Mount Lemmon || Mount Lemmon Survey || HOF || align=right | 2.6 km || 
|-id=568 bgcolor=#E9E9E9
| 497568 ||  || — || February 27, 2006 || Kitt Peak || Spacewatch ||  || align=right | 2.3 km || 
|-id=569 bgcolor=#fefefe
| 497569 ||  || — || February 27, 2006 || Mount Lemmon || Mount Lemmon Survey || H || align=right data-sort-value="0.62" | 620 m || 
|-id=570 bgcolor=#E9E9E9
| 497570 ||  || — || February 27, 2006 || Mount Lemmon || Mount Lemmon Survey ||  || align=right | 1.6 km || 
|-id=571 bgcolor=#E9E9E9
| 497571 ||  || — || January 26, 2006 || Mount Lemmon || Mount Lemmon Survey ||  || align=right | 1.9 km || 
|-id=572 bgcolor=#E9E9E9
| 497572 ||  || — || February 24, 2006 || Kitt Peak || Spacewatch ||  || align=right | 1.9 km || 
|-id=573 bgcolor=#E9E9E9
| 497573 ||  || — || January 8, 2006 || Mount Lemmon || Mount Lemmon Survey ||  || align=right | 1.4 km || 
|-id=574 bgcolor=#E9E9E9
| 497574 ||  || — || March 2, 2006 || Kitt Peak || Spacewatch ||  || align=right | 1.6 km || 
|-id=575 bgcolor=#E9E9E9
| 497575 ||  || — || January 30, 2006 || Kitt Peak || Spacewatch ||  || align=right | 1.8 km || 
|-id=576 bgcolor=#E9E9E9
| 497576 ||  || — || February 21, 2006 || Catalina || CSS ||  || align=right | 2.2 km || 
|-id=577 bgcolor=#fefefe
| 497577 ||  || — || February 20, 2006 || Catalina || CSS || H || align=right data-sort-value="0.62" | 620 m || 
|-id=578 bgcolor=#FA8072
| 497578 ||  || — || March 23, 2006 || Catalina || CSS ||  || align=right data-sort-value="0.72" | 720 m || 
|-id=579 bgcolor=#fefefe
| 497579 ||  || — || March 24, 2006 || Kitt Peak || Spacewatch ||  || align=right data-sort-value="0.57" | 570 m || 
|-id=580 bgcolor=#d6d6d6
| 497580 ||  || — || April 7, 2006 || Kitt Peak || Spacewatch || AGN || align=right | 1.9 km || 
|-id=581 bgcolor=#fefefe
| 497581 ||  || — || April 7, 2006 || Anderson Mesa || LONEOS || PHO || align=right data-sort-value="0.92" | 920 m || 
|-id=582 bgcolor=#E9E9E9
| 497582 ||  || — || April 19, 2006 || Kitt Peak || Spacewatch ||  || align=right | 1.9 km || 
|-id=583 bgcolor=#E9E9E9
| 497583 ||  || — || April 19, 2006 || Mount Lemmon || Mount Lemmon Survey ||  || align=right | 3.8 km || 
|-id=584 bgcolor=#d6d6d6
| 497584 ||  || — || April 20, 2006 || Kitt Peak || Spacewatch ||  || align=right | 2.7 km || 
|-id=585 bgcolor=#fefefe
| 497585 ||  || — || April 20, 2006 || Kitt Peak || Spacewatch ||  || align=right data-sort-value="0.54" | 540 m || 
|-id=586 bgcolor=#FA8072
| 497586 ||  || — || April 24, 2006 || Kitt Peak || Spacewatch ||  || align=right | 1.3 km || 
|-id=587 bgcolor=#d6d6d6
| 497587 ||  || — || April 24, 2006 || Kitt Peak || Spacewatch ||  || align=right | 3.2 km || 
|-id=588 bgcolor=#fefefe
| 497588 ||  || — || April 25, 2006 || Kitt Peak || Spacewatch ||  || align=right data-sort-value="0.70" | 700 m || 
|-id=589 bgcolor=#E9E9E9
| 497589 ||  || — || April 29, 2006 || Kitt Peak || Spacewatch ||  || align=right | 1.9 km || 
|-id=590 bgcolor=#d6d6d6
| 497590 ||  || — || April 21, 2006 || Kitt Peak || Spacewatch ||  || align=right | 2.8 km || 
|-id=591 bgcolor=#d6d6d6
| 497591 ||  || — || April 24, 2006 || Kitt Peak || Spacewatch ||  || align=right | 1.8 km || 
|-id=592 bgcolor=#d6d6d6
| 497592 ||  || — || May 4, 2006 || Kitt Peak || Spacewatch ||  || align=right | 1.5 km || 
|-id=593 bgcolor=#d6d6d6
| 497593 Kejimkujik ||  ||  || May 1, 2006 || Mauna Kea || P. A. Wiegert ||  || align=right | 2.0 km || 
|-id=594 bgcolor=#fefefe
| 497594 ||  || — || May 19, 2006 || Mount Lemmon || Mount Lemmon Survey ||  || align=right data-sort-value="0.49" | 490 m || 
|-id=595 bgcolor=#d6d6d6
| 497595 ||  || — || March 2, 2006 || Kitt Peak || Spacewatch ||  || align=right | 3.1 km || 
|-id=596 bgcolor=#d6d6d6
| 497596 ||  || — || May 4, 2006 || Kitt Peak || Spacewatch ||  || align=right | 1.8 km || 
|-id=597 bgcolor=#fefefe
| 497597 ||  || — || May 20, 2006 || Kitt Peak || Spacewatch ||  || align=right data-sort-value="0.55" | 550 m || 
|-id=598 bgcolor=#fefefe
| 497598 ||  || — || May 19, 2006 || Mount Lemmon || Mount Lemmon Survey || H || align=right data-sort-value="0.61" | 610 m || 
|-id=599 bgcolor=#d6d6d6
| 497599 ||  || — || May 7, 2006 || Mount Lemmon || Mount Lemmon Survey ||  || align=right | 1.8 km || 
|-id=600 bgcolor=#fefefe
| 497600 ||  || — || May 8, 2006 || Kitt Peak || Spacewatch ||  || align=right data-sort-value="0.48" | 480 m || 
|}

497601–497700 

|-bgcolor=#fefefe
| 497601 ||  || — || May 23, 2006 || Kitt Peak || Spacewatch || H || align=right data-sort-value="0.54" | 540 m || 
|-id=602 bgcolor=#d6d6d6
| 497602 ||  || — || May 9, 2006 || Mount Lemmon || Mount Lemmon Survey ||  || align=right | 2.4 km || 
|-id=603 bgcolor=#fefefe
| 497603 ||  || — || May 3, 2006 || Mount Lemmon || Mount Lemmon Survey || NYS || align=right data-sort-value="0.52" | 520 m || 
|-id=604 bgcolor=#fefefe
| 497604 ||  || — || May 31, 2006 || Kitt Peak || Spacewatch ||  || align=right data-sort-value="0.67" | 670 m || 
|-id=605 bgcolor=#d6d6d6
| 497605 ||  || — || April 20, 2006 || Kitt Peak || Spacewatch ||  || align=right | 2.5 km || 
|-id=606 bgcolor=#d6d6d6
| 497606 ||  || — || April 24, 2006 || Kitt Peak || Spacewatch || EUP || align=right | 3.4 km || 
|-id=607 bgcolor=#d6d6d6
| 497607 ||  || — || July 21, 2006 || Mount Lemmon || Mount Lemmon Survey ||  || align=right | 2.8 km || 
|-id=608 bgcolor=#fefefe
| 497608 ||  || — || August 12, 2006 || Palomar || NEAT ||  || align=right data-sort-value="0.62" | 620 m || 
|-id=609 bgcolor=#fefefe
| 497609 ||  || — || August 12, 2006 || Palomar || NEAT || H || align=right data-sort-value="0.83" | 830 m || 
|-id=610 bgcolor=#fefefe
| 497610 ||  || — || June 24, 1995 || Kitt Peak || Spacewatch ||  || align=right data-sort-value="0.53" | 530 m || 
|-id=611 bgcolor=#d6d6d6
| 497611 ||  || — || August 14, 2006 || Siding Spring || SSS ||  || align=right | 2.3 km || 
|-id=612 bgcolor=#d6d6d6
| 497612 ||  || — || August 17, 2006 || Palomar || NEAT ||  || align=right | 2.2 km || 
|-id=613 bgcolor=#d6d6d6
| 497613 ||  || — || August 18, 2006 || Kitt Peak || Spacewatch ||  || align=right | 2.8 km || 
|-id=614 bgcolor=#FA8072
| 497614 ||  || — || July 21, 2006 || Catalina || CSS ||  || align=right data-sort-value="0.83" | 830 m || 
|-id=615 bgcolor=#fefefe
| 497615 ||  || — || August 19, 2006 || Kitt Peak || Spacewatch || NYS || align=right data-sort-value="0.58" | 580 m || 
|-id=616 bgcolor=#FA8072
| 497616 ||  || — || August 16, 2006 || Siding Spring || SSS ||  || align=right data-sort-value="0.72" | 720 m || 
|-id=617 bgcolor=#fefefe
| 497617 ||  || — || August 17, 2006 || Palomar || NEAT ||  || align=right data-sort-value="0.64" | 640 m || 
|-id=618 bgcolor=#d6d6d6
| 497618 ||  || — || August 16, 2006 || Siding Spring || SSS ||  || align=right | 2.9 km || 
|-id=619 bgcolor=#B88A00
| 497619 ||  || — || August 19, 2006 || Anderson Mesa || LONEOS || unusual || align=right | 10 km || 
|-id=620 bgcolor=#fefefe
| 497620 ||  || — || August 21, 2006 || Palomar || NEAT ||  || align=right data-sort-value="0.72" | 720 m || 
|-id=621 bgcolor=#fefefe
| 497621 ||  || — || August 22, 2006 || Palomar || NEAT || NYS || align=right data-sort-value="0.54" | 540 m || 
|-id=622 bgcolor=#d6d6d6
| 497622 ||  || — || August 18, 2006 || Kitt Peak || Spacewatch ||  || align=right | 3.1 km || 
|-id=623 bgcolor=#fefefe
| 497623 ||  || — || August 22, 2006 || Palomar || NEAT || H || align=right data-sort-value="0.68" | 680 m || 
|-id=624 bgcolor=#fefefe
| 497624 ||  || — || August 21, 2006 || Kitt Peak || Spacewatch ||  || align=right data-sort-value="0.81" | 810 m || 
|-id=625 bgcolor=#fefefe
| 497625 ||  || — || August 24, 2006 || Palomar || NEAT ||  || align=right data-sort-value="0.77" | 770 m || 
|-id=626 bgcolor=#FFC2E0
| 497626 ||  || — || August 29, 2006 || Catalina || CSS || APO || align=right data-sort-value="0.34" | 340 m || 
|-id=627 bgcolor=#fefefe
| 497627 ||  || — || August 16, 2006 || Palomar || NEAT ||  || align=right data-sort-value="0.95" | 950 m || 
|-id=628 bgcolor=#d6d6d6
| 497628 ||  || — || August 19, 2006 || Kitt Peak || Spacewatch ||  || align=right | 3.4 km || 
|-id=629 bgcolor=#fefefe
| 497629 ||  || — || August 28, 2006 || Catalina || CSS ||  || align=right data-sort-value="0.71" | 710 m || 
|-id=630 bgcolor=#fefefe
| 497630 ||  || — || August 27, 2006 || Anderson Mesa || LONEOS ||  || align=right data-sort-value="0.91" | 910 m || 
|-id=631 bgcolor=#d6d6d6
| 497631 ||  || — || August 24, 2006 || Socorro || LINEAR || LIX || align=right | 3.7 km || 
|-id=632 bgcolor=#fefefe
| 497632 ||  || — || August 21, 2006 || Kitt Peak || Spacewatch ||  || align=right data-sort-value="0.85" | 850 m || 
|-id=633 bgcolor=#d6d6d6
| 497633 ||  || — || August 29, 2006 || Anderson Mesa || LONEOS ||  || align=right | 2.8 km || 
|-id=634 bgcolor=#d6d6d6
| 497634 ||  || — || August 21, 2006 || Kitt Peak || Spacewatch ||  || align=right | 2.7 km || 
|-id=635 bgcolor=#d6d6d6
| 497635 ||  || — || August 18, 2006 || Kitt Peak || Spacewatch || THM || align=right | 2.5 km || 
|-id=636 bgcolor=#d6d6d6
| 497636 ||  || — || August 18, 2006 || Kitt Peak || Spacewatch || THM || align=right | 2.3 km || 
|-id=637 bgcolor=#d6d6d6
| 497637 ||  || — || August 18, 2006 || Kitt Peak || Spacewatch || THM || align=right | 1.9 km || 
|-id=638 bgcolor=#fefefe
| 497638 ||  || — || September 14, 2006 || Catalina || CSS ||  || align=right data-sort-value="0.91" | 910 m || 
|-id=639 bgcolor=#fefefe
| 497639 ||  || — || September 12, 2006 || Catalina || CSS || MAS || align=right data-sort-value="0.71" | 710 m || 
|-id=640 bgcolor=#fefefe
| 497640 ||  || — || August 28, 2006 || Catalina || CSS ||  || align=right data-sort-value="0.67" | 670 m || 
|-id=641 bgcolor=#d6d6d6
| 497641 ||  || — || August 30, 2006 || Anderson Mesa || LONEOS ||  || align=right | 3.2 km || 
|-id=642 bgcolor=#d6d6d6
| 497642 ||  || — || September 15, 2006 || Kitt Peak || Spacewatch || THM || align=right | 1.8 km || 
|-id=643 bgcolor=#fefefe
| 497643 ||  || — || August 28, 2006 || Catalina || CSS || NYS || align=right data-sort-value="0.65" | 650 m || 
|-id=644 bgcolor=#d6d6d6
| 497644 ||  || — || September 14, 2006 || Kitt Peak || Spacewatch ||  || align=right | 2.4 km || 
|-id=645 bgcolor=#d6d6d6
| 497645 ||  || — || September 14, 2006 || Kitt Peak || Spacewatch ||  || align=right | 2.2 km || 
|-id=646 bgcolor=#fefefe
| 497646 ||  || — || September 14, 2006 || Kitt Peak || Spacewatch || NYSfast? || align=right data-sort-value="0.53" | 530 m || 
|-id=647 bgcolor=#fefefe
| 497647 ||  || — || September 14, 2006 || Kitt Peak || Spacewatch || NYS || align=right data-sort-value="0.71" | 710 m || 
|-id=648 bgcolor=#d6d6d6
| 497648 ||  || — || September 14, 2006 || Kitt Peak || Spacewatch ||  || align=right | 2.2 km || 
|-id=649 bgcolor=#d6d6d6
| 497649 ||  || — || September 14, 2006 || Kitt Peak || Spacewatch || Tj (2.93) || align=right | 3.2 km || 
|-id=650 bgcolor=#fefefe
| 497650 ||  || — || September 14, 2006 || Kitt Peak || Spacewatch ||  || align=right data-sort-value="0.54" | 540 m || 
|-id=651 bgcolor=#d6d6d6
| 497651 ||  || — || September 14, 2006 || Kitt Peak || Spacewatch || EOS || align=right | 2.9 km || 
|-id=652 bgcolor=#fefefe
| 497652 ||  || — || September 14, 2006 || Kitt Peak || Spacewatch || NYS || align=right data-sort-value="0.51" | 510 m || 
|-id=653 bgcolor=#d6d6d6
| 497653 ||  || — || July 21, 2006 || Mount Lemmon || Mount Lemmon Survey || THM || align=right | 2.2 km || 
|-id=654 bgcolor=#fefefe
| 497654 ||  || — || August 28, 2006 || Kitt Peak || Spacewatch || NYS || align=right data-sort-value="0.77" | 770 m || 
|-id=655 bgcolor=#d6d6d6
| 497655 ||  || — || September 14, 2006 || Kitt Peak || Spacewatch ||  || align=right | 3.0 km || 
|-id=656 bgcolor=#d6d6d6
| 497656 ||  || — || September 14, 2006 || Kitt Peak || Spacewatch || EUP || align=right | 3.8 km || 
|-id=657 bgcolor=#fefefe
| 497657 ||  || — || August 29, 2006 || Kitt Peak || Spacewatch ||  || align=right data-sort-value="0.65" | 650 m || 
|-id=658 bgcolor=#fefefe
| 497658 ||  || — || September 15, 2006 || Kitt Peak || Spacewatch ||  || align=right data-sort-value="0.63" | 630 m || 
|-id=659 bgcolor=#fefefe
| 497659 ||  || — || September 15, 2006 || Kitt Peak || Spacewatch || MAS || align=right data-sort-value="0.48" | 480 m || 
|-id=660 bgcolor=#fefefe
| 497660 ||  || — || September 15, 2006 || Kitt Peak || Spacewatch || NYS || align=right data-sort-value="0.49" | 490 m || 
|-id=661 bgcolor=#fefefe
| 497661 ||  || — || September 15, 2006 || Kitt Peak || Spacewatch ||  || align=right data-sort-value="0.60" | 600 m || 
|-id=662 bgcolor=#d6d6d6
| 497662 ||  || — || September 15, 2006 || Kitt Peak || Spacewatch || THM || align=right | 2.2 km || 
|-id=663 bgcolor=#fefefe
| 497663 ||  || — || September 15, 2006 || Kitt Peak || Spacewatch || MAS || align=right data-sort-value="0.70" | 700 m || 
|-id=664 bgcolor=#fefefe
| 497664 ||  || — || September 15, 2006 || Kitt Peak || Spacewatch ||  || align=right data-sort-value="0.60" | 600 m || 
|-id=665 bgcolor=#fefefe
| 497665 ||  || — || September 15, 2006 || Kitt Peak || Spacewatch || MAS || align=right data-sort-value="0.50" | 500 m || 
|-id=666 bgcolor=#fefefe
| 497666 ||  || — || September 15, 2006 || Kitt Peak || Spacewatch ||  || align=right data-sort-value="0.63" | 630 m || 
|-id=667 bgcolor=#fefefe
| 497667 ||  || — || September 15, 2006 || Kitt Peak || Spacewatch ||  || align=right data-sort-value="0.67" | 670 m || 
|-id=668 bgcolor=#d6d6d6
| 497668 ||  || — || September 15, 2006 || Kitt Peak || Spacewatch || VER || align=right | 2.7 km || 
|-id=669 bgcolor=#d6d6d6
| 497669 ||  || — || September 15, 2006 || Kitt Peak || Spacewatch ||  || align=right | 3.0 km || 
|-id=670 bgcolor=#d6d6d6
| 497670 ||  || — || September 15, 2006 || Kitt Peak || Spacewatch ||  || align=right | 2.8 km || 
|-id=671 bgcolor=#d6d6d6
| 497671 ||  || — || September 11, 2006 || Apache Point || A. C. Becker || EOS || align=right | 1.4 km || 
|-id=672 bgcolor=#fefefe
| 497672 ||  || — || September 14, 2006 || Mauna Kea || J. Masiero || SUL || align=right data-sort-value="0.68" | 680 m || 
|-id=673 bgcolor=#fefefe
| 497673 ||  || — || September 14, 2006 || Kitt Peak || Spacewatch ||  || align=right data-sort-value="0.46" | 460 m || 
|-id=674 bgcolor=#d6d6d6
| 497674 ||  || — || September 16, 2006 || Kitt Peak || Spacewatch ||  || align=right | 3.5 km || 
|-id=675 bgcolor=#d6d6d6
| 497675 ||  || — || September 16, 2006 || Catalina || CSS ||  || align=right | 3.2 km || 
|-id=676 bgcolor=#FA8072
| 497676 ||  || — || September 16, 2006 || Catalina || CSS ||  || align=right data-sort-value="0.87" | 870 m || 
|-id=677 bgcolor=#d6d6d6
| 497677 ||  || — || September 17, 2006 || Vail-Jarnac || Jarnac Obs. ||  || align=right | 2.4 km || 
|-id=678 bgcolor=#fefefe
| 497678 ||  || — || August 28, 2006 || Kitt Peak || Spacewatch || MAS || align=right data-sort-value="0.66" | 660 m || 
|-id=679 bgcolor=#d6d6d6
| 497679 ||  || — || August 18, 2006 || Kitt Peak || Spacewatch ||  || align=right | 3.6 km || 
|-id=680 bgcolor=#d6d6d6
| 497680 ||  || — || September 17, 2006 || Kitt Peak || Spacewatch ||  || align=right | 2.3 km || 
|-id=681 bgcolor=#fefefe
| 497681 ||  || — || September 16, 2006 || Catalina || CSS ||  || align=right data-sort-value="0.69" | 690 m || 
|-id=682 bgcolor=#fefefe
| 497682 ||  || — || September 16, 2006 || Anderson Mesa || LONEOS ||  || align=right data-sort-value="0.80" | 800 m || 
|-id=683 bgcolor=#fefefe
| 497683 ||  || — || September 17, 2006 || Kitt Peak || Spacewatch || MAS || align=right data-sort-value="0.53" | 530 m || 
|-id=684 bgcolor=#d6d6d6
| 497684 ||  || — || September 17, 2006 || Kitt Peak || Spacewatch || HYG || align=right | 2.2 km || 
|-id=685 bgcolor=#d6d6d6
| 497685 ||  || — || August 28, 2006 || Catalina || CSS || EUP || align=right | 2.9 km || 
|-id=686 bgcolor=#d6d6d6
| 497686 ||  || — || September 18, 2006 || Kitt Peak || Spacewatch || (3460) || align=right | 1.8 km || 
|-id=687 bgcolor=#d6d6d6
| 497687 ||  || — || July 25, 2006 || Mount Lemmon || Mount Lemmon Survey ||  || align=right | 2.9 km || 
|-id=688 bgcolor=#d6d6d6
| 497688 ||  || — || August 29, 2006 || Anderson Mesa || LONEOS || TIR || align=right | 3.4 km || 
|-id=689 bgcolor=#d6d6d6
| 497689 ||  || — || September 16, 2006 || Catalina || CSS || URS || align=right | 3.2 km || 
|-id=690 bgcolor=#fefefe
| 497690 ||  || — || September 19, 2006 || Anderson Mesa || LONEOS ||  || align=right data-sort-value="0.72" | 720 m || 
|-id=691 bgcolor=#fefefe
| 497691 ||  || — || September 15, 2006 || Kitt Peak || Spacewatch ||  || align=right data-sort-value="0.56" | 560 m || 
|-id=692 bgcolor=#fefefe
| 497692 ||  || — || September 19, 2006 || Kitt Peak || Spacewatch ||  || align=right data-sort-value="0.56" | 560 m || 
|-id=693 bgcolor=#d6d6d6
| 497693 ||  || — || September 19, 2006 || Kitt Peak || Spacewatch || HYG || align=right | 2.8 km || 
|-id=694 bgcolor=#d6d6d6
| 497694 ||  || — || September 19, 2006 || Kitt Peak || Spacewatch || THM || align=right | 2.3 km || 
|-id=695 bgcolor=#fefefe
| 497695 ||  || — || September 19, 2006 || Kitt Peak || Spacewatch ||  || align=right data-sort-value="0.52" | 520 m || 
|-id=696 bgcolor=#d6d6d6
| 497696 ||  || — || September 19, 2006 || Kitt Peak || Spacewatch || THM || align=right | 2.0 km || 
|-id=697 bgcolor=#d6d6d6
| 497697 ||  || — || September 19, 2006 || Kitt Peak || Spacewatch ||  || align=right | 2.9 km || 
|-id=698 bgcolor=#d6d6d6
| 497698 ||  || — || September 19, 2006 || Kitt Peak || Spacewatch || EUP || align=right | 3.1 km || 
|-id=699 bgcolor=#fefefe
| 497699 ||  || — || September 19, 2006 || Kitt Peak || Spacewatch || NYS || align=right data-sort-value="0.58" | 580 m || 
|-id=700 bgcolor=#d6d6d6
| 497700 ||  || — || September 18, 2006 || Kitt Peak || Spacewatch || EOS || align=right | 1.5 km || 
|}

497701–497800 

|-bgcolor=#d6d6d6
| 497701 ||  || — || September 18, 2006 || Kitt Peak || Spacewatch || TIR || align=right | 2.9 km || 
|-id=702 bgcolor=#fefefe
| 497702 ||  || — || September 18, 2006 || Kitt Peak || Spacewatch || NYS || align=right data-sort-value="0.56" | 560 m || 
|-id=703 bgcolor=#fefefe
| 497703 ||  || — || September 18, 2006 || Kitt Peak || Spacewatch || MAS || align=right data-sort-value="0.66" | 660 m || 
|-id=704 bgcolor=#fefefe
| 497704 ||  || — || September 18, 2006 || Kitt Peak || Spacewatch ||  || align=right data-sort-value="0.63" | 630 m || 
|-id=705 bgcolor=#d6d6d6
| 497705 ||  || — || September 18, 2006 || Kitt Peak || Spacewatch ||  || align=right | 3.1 km || 
|-id=706 bgcolor=#fefefe
| 497706 ||  || — || September 18, 2006 || Kitt Peak || Spacewatch || MAS || align=right data-sort-value="0.57" | 570 m || 
|-id=707 bgcolor=#fefefe
| 497707 ||  || — || September 18, 2006 || Kitt Peak || Spacewatch || NYS || align=right data-sort-value="0.51" | 510 m || 
|-id=708 bgcolor=#fefefe
| 497708 ||  || — || September 19, 2006 || Kitt Peak || Spacewatch || MAS || align=right data-sort-value="0.61" | 610 m || 
|-id=709 bgcolor=#d6d6d6
| 497709 ||  || — || September 19, 2006 || Catalina || CSS || THB || align=right | 2.7 km || 
|-id=710 bgcolor=#fefefe
| 497710 ||  || — || September 19, 2006 || Kitt Peak || Spacewatch ||  || align=right data-sort-value="0.63" | 630 m || 
|-id=711 bgcolor=#d6d6d6
| 497711 ||  || — || September 19, 2006 || Kitt Peak || Spacewatch ||  || align=right | 2.3 km || 
|-id=712 bgcolor=#d6d6d6
| 497712 ||  || — || September 23, 2006 || Kitt Peak || Spacewatch || THM || align=right | 2.1 km || 
|-id=713 bgcolor=#d6d6d6
| 497713 ||  || — || September 24, 2006 || Kitt Peak || Spacewatch ||  || align=right | 2.9 km || 
|-id=714 bgcolor=#d6d6d6
| 497714 ||  || — || September 15, 2006 || Kitt Peak || Spacewatch ||  || align=right | 2.2 km || 
|-id=715 bgcolor=#fefefe
| 497715 ||  || — || September 18, 2006 || Catalina || CSS ||  || align=right data-sort-value="0.81" | 810 m || 
|-id=716 bgcolor=#d6d6d6
| 497716 ||  || — || September 18, 2006 || Catalina || CSS ||  || align=right | 2.7 km || 
|-id=717 bgcolor=#d6d6d6
| 497717 ||  || — || September 20, 2006 || Kitt Peak || Spacewatch ||  || align=right | 2.7 km || 
|-id=718 bgcolor=#fefefe
| 497718 ||  || — || September 16, 2006 || Catalina || CSS ||  || align=right data-sort-value="0.62" | 620 m || 
|-id=719 bgcolor=#d6d6d6
| 497719 ||  || — || September 19, 2006 || Kitt Peak || Spacewatch ||  || align=right | 2.7 km || 
|-id=720 bgcolor=#fefefe
| 497720 ||  || — || September 19, 2006 || Kitt Peak || Spacewatch ||  || align=right data-sort-value="0.73" | 730 m || 
|-id=721 bgcolor=#d6d6d6
| 497721 ||  || — || September 15, 2006 || Kitt Peak || Spacewatch || HYG || align=right | 2.3 km || 
|-id=722 bgcolor=#d6d6d6
| 497722 ||  || — || September 15, 2006 || Kitt Peak || Spacewatch || THM || align=right | 2.2 km || 
|-id=723 bgcolor=#fefefe
| 497723 ||  || — || September 24, 2006 || Kitt Peak || Spacewatch ||  || align=right data-sort-value="0.67" | 670 m || 
|-id=724 bgcolor=#d6d6d6
| 497724 ||  || — || September 25, 2006 || Kitt Peak || Spacewatch || EUP || align=right | 2.9 km || 
|-id=725 bgcolor=#fefefe
| 497725 ||  || — || September 17, 2006 || Kitt Peak || Spacewatch ||  || align=right data-sort-value="0.63" | 630 m || 
|-id=726 bgcolor=#d6d6d6
| 497726 ||  || — || September 25, 2006 || Kitt Peak || Spacewatch ||  || align=right | 2.7 km || 
|-id=727 bgcolor=#d6d6d6
| 497727 ||  || — || September 25, 2006 || Kitt Peak || Spacewatch || TIR || align=right | 2.3 km || 
|-id=728 bgcolor=#d6d6d6
| 497728 ||  || — || September 17, 2006 || Kitt Peak || Spacewatch ||  || align=right | 2.4 km || 
|-id=729 bgcolor=#d6d6d6
| 497729 ||  || — || September 25, 2006 || Kitt Peak || Spacewatch || HYG || align=right | 2.6 km || 
|-id=730 bgcolor=#fefefe
| 497730 ||  || — || September 25, 2006 || Mount Lemmon || Mount Lemmon Survey ||  || align=right data-sort-value="0.69" | 690 m || 
|-id=731 bgcolor=#fefefe
| 497731 ||  || — || September 25, 2006 || Mount Lemmon || Mount Lemmon Survey ||  || align=right data-sort-value="0.56" | 560 m || 
|-id=732 bgcolor=#fefefe
| 497732 ||  || — || September 25, 2006 || Kitt Peak || Spacewatch || MAS || align=right data-sort-value="0.51" | 510 m || 
|-id=733 bgcolor=#d6d6d6
| 497733 ||  || — || September 25, 2006 || Kitt Peak || Spacewatch || VER || align=right | 2.5 km || 
|-id=734 bgcolor=#d6d6d6
| 497734 ||  || — || September 25, 2006 || Kitt Peak || Spacewatch ||  || align=right | 2.9 km || 
|-id=735 bgcolor=#d6d6d6
| 497735 ||  || — || September 26, 2006 || Kitt Peak || Spacewatch ||  || align=right | 2.9 km || 
|-id=736 bgcolor=#d6d6d6
| 497736 ||  || — || September 25, 2006 || Kitt Peak || Spacewatch ||  || align=right | 2.2 km || 
|-id=737 bgcolor=#fefefe
| 497737 ||  || — || September 18, 2006 || Catalina || CSS || (5026) || align=right data-sort-value="0.67" | 670 m || 
|-id=738 bgcolor=#fefefe
| 497738 ||  || — || September 25, 2006 || Mount Lemmon || Mount Lemmon Survey ||  || align=right data-sort-value="0.56" | 560 m || 
|-id=739 bgcolor=#d6d6d6
| 497739 ||  || — || September 27, 2006 || Kitt Peak || Spacewatch ||  || align=right | 2.6 km || 
|-id=740 bgcolor=#d6d6d6
| 497740 ||  || — || September 17, 2006 || Kitt Peak || Spacewatch ||  || align=right | 3.3 km || 
|-id=741 bgcolor=#fefefe
| 497741 ||  || — || September 27, 2006 || Kitt Peak || Spacewatch ||  || align=right data-sort-value="0.58" | 580 m || 
|-id=742 bgcolor=#fefefe
| 497742 ||  || — || September 17, 2006 || Kitt Peak || Spacewatch || NYS || align=right data-sort-value="0.47" | 470 m || 
|-id=743 bgcolor=#d6d6d6
| 497743 ||  || — || September 15, 2006 || Kitt Peak || Spacewatch ||  || align=right | 2.4 km || 
|-id=744 bgcolor=#d6d6d6
| 497744 ||  || — || September 18, 2006 || Kitt Peak || Spacewatch ||  || align=right | 2.4 km || 
|-id=745 bgcolor=#d6d6d6
| 497745 ||  || — || September 26, 2006 || Kitt Peak || Spacewatch ||  || align=right | 1.9 km || 
|-id=746 bgcolor=#d6d6d6
| 497746 ||  || — || September 18, 2006 || Kitt Peak || Spacewatch ||  || align=right | 2.9 km || 
|-id=747 bgcolor=#d6d6d6
| 497747 ||  || — || September 26, 2006 || Mount Lemmon || Mount Lemmon Survey || EOS || align=right | 1.5 km || 
|-id=748 bgcolor=#fefefe
| 497748 ||  || — || September 26, 2006 || Kitt Peak || Spacewatch ||  || align=right data-sort-value="0.59" | 590 m || 
|-id=749 bgcolor=#fefefe
| 497749 ||  || — || September 18, 2006 || Kitt Peak || Spacewatch ||  || align=right data-sort-value="0.88" | 880 m || 
|-id=750 bgcolor=#d6d6d6
| 497750 ||  || — || September 26, 2006 || Kitt Peak || Spacewatch || THM || align=right | 2.3 km || 
|-id=751 bgcolor=#fefefe
| 497751 ||  || — || September 15, 2006 || Kitt Peak || Spacewatch ||  || align=right data-sort-value="0.66" | 660 m || 
|-id=752 bgcolor=#d6d6d6
| 497752 ||  || — || September 15, 2006 || Kitt Peak || Spacewatch || EOS || align=right | 1.8 km || 
|-id=753 bgcolor=#d6d6d6
| 497753 ||  || — || September 18, 2006 || Kitt Peak || Spacewatch ||  || align=right | 2.3 km || 
|-id=754 bgcolor=#d6d6d6
| 497754 ||  || — || September 15, 2006 || Kitt Peak || Spacewatch ||  || align=right | 2.1 km || 
|-id=755 bgcolor=#fefefe
| 497755 ||  || — || September 26, 2006 || Kitt Peak || Spacewatch ||  || align=right data-sort-value="0.79" | 790 m || 
|-id=756 bgcolor=#fefefe
| 497756 ||  || — || September 28, 2006 || Kitt Peak || Spacewatch || MAS || align=right data-sort-value="0.75" | 750 m || 
|-id=757 bgcolor=#fefefe
| 497757 ||  || — || September 29, 2006 || Anderson Mesa || LONEOS ||  || align=right data-sort-value="0.68" | 680 m || 
|-id=758 bgcolor=#fefefe
| 497758 ||  || — || September 26, 2006 || Catalina || CSS ||  || align=right data-sort-value="0.74" | 740 m || 
|-id=759 bgcolor=#d6d6d6
| 497759 ||  || — || September 29, 2006 || Anderson Mesa || LONEOS || LIX || align=right | 3.7 km || 
|-id=760 bgcolor=#fefefe
| 497760 ||  || — || September 25, 2006 || Kitt Peak || Spacewatch || MAS || align=right data-sort-value="0.56" | 560 m || 
|-id=761 bgcolor=#fefefe
| 497761 ||  || — || September 17, 2006 || Kitt Peak || Spacewatch ||  || align=right data-sort-value="0.77" | 770 m || 
|-id=762 bgcolor=#d6d6d6
| 497762 ||  || — || September 17, 2006 || Catalina || CSS || VER || align=right | 2.5 km || 
|-id=763 bgcolor=#d6d6d6
| 497763 ||  || — || September 15, 2006 || Kitt Peak || Spacewatch || TIR || align=right | 2.2 km || 
|-id=764 bgcolor=#d6d6d6
| 497764 ||  || — || September 19, 2006 || Catalina || CSS ||  || align=right | 2.9 km || 
|-id=765 bgcolor=#fefefe
| 497765 ||  || — || September 27, 2006 || Kitt Peak || Spacewatch || CLA || align=right data-sort-value="0.56" | 560 m || 
|-id=766 bgcolor=#d6d6d6
| 497766 ||  || — || September 17, 2006 || Kitt Peak || Spacewatch ||  || align=right | 2.9 km || 
|-id=767 bgcolor=#d6d6d6
| 497767 ||  || — || September 17, 2006 || Kitt Peak || Spacewatch ||  || align=right | 2.5 km || 
|-id=768 bgcolor=#d6d6d6
| 497768 ||  || — || September 27, 2006 || Kitt Peak || Spacewatch || THM || align=right | 2.1 km || 
|-id=769 bgcolor=#fefefe
| 497769 ||  || — || September 17, 2006 || Kitt Peak || Spacewatch || MAS || align=right data-sort-value="0.50" | 500 m || 
|-id=770 bgcolor=#fefefe
| 497770 ||  || — || September 18, 2006 || Kitt Peak || Spacewatch ||  || align=right data-sort-value="0.64" | 640 m || 
|-id=771 bgcolor=#d6d6d6
| 497771 ||  || — || September 27, 2006 || Kitt Peak || Spacewatch ||  || align=right | 3.2 km || 
|-id=772 bgcolor=#d6d6d6
| 497772 ||  || — || September 19, 2006 || Kitt Peak || Spacewatch || THM || align=right | 2.3 km || 
|-id=773 bgcolor=#d6d6d6
| 497773 ||  || — || September 27, 2006 || Kitt Peak || Spacewatch || HYG || align=right | 2.4 km || 
|-id=774 bgcolor=#d6d6d6
| 497774 ||  || — || September 28, 2006 || Mount Lemmon || Mount Lemmon Survey ||  || align=right | 2.3 km || 
|-id=775 bgcolor=#fefefe
| 497775 ||  || — || September 28, 2006 || Mount Lemmon || Mount Lemmon Survey ||  || align=right data-sort-value="0.81" | 810 m || 
|-id=776 bgcolor=#fefefe
| 497776 ||  || — || September 28, 2006 || Mount Lemmon || Mount Lemmon Survey || (5026) || align=right data-sort-value="0.66" | 660 m || 
|-id=777 bgcolor=#fefefe
| 497777 ||  || — || September 28, 2006 || Kitt Peak || Spacewatch || NYS || align=right data-sort-value="0.53" | 530 m || 
|-id=778 bgcolor=#fefefe
| 497778 ||  || — || September 28, 2006 || Kitt Peak || Spacewatch || V || align=right data-sort-value="0.50" | 500 m || 
|-id=779 bgcolor=#d6d6d6
| 497779 ||  || — || September 28, 2006 || Kitt Peak || Spacewatch ||  || align=right | 2.6 km || 
|-id=780 bgcolor=#d6d6d6
| 497780 ||  || — || September 28, 2006 || Kitt Peak || Spacewatch || LIX || align=right | 3.1 km || 
|-id=781 bgcolor=#fefefe
| 497781 ||  || — || September 30, 2006 || Catalina || CSS ||  || align=right data-sort-value="0.70" | 700 m || 
|-id=782 bgcolor=#fefefe
| 497782 ||  || — || September 16, 2006 || Catalina || CSS ||  || align=right data-sort-value="0.88" | 880 m || 
|-id=783 bgcolor=#d6d6d6
| 497783 ||  || — || September 28, 2006 || Apache Point || A. C. Becker ||  || align=right | 2.7 km || 
|-id=784 bgcolor=#d6d6d6
| 497784 ||  || — || September 29, 2006 || Apache Point || A. C. Becker || THM || align=right | 2.0 km || 
|-id=785 bgcolor=#d6d6d6
| 497785 ||  || — || September 29, 2006 || Apache Point || A. C. Becker ||  || align=right | 2.4 km || 
|-id=786 bgcolor=#C2FFFF
| 497786 ||  || — || September 30, 2006 || Apache Point || A. C. Becker || L4 || align=right | 4.6 km || 
|-id=787 bgcolor=#d6d6d6
| 497787 ||  || — || September 30, 2006 || Apache Point || A. C. Becker || EUP || align=right | 2.8 km || 
|-id=788 bgcolor=#fefefe
| 497788 ||  || — || September 26, 2006 || Mount Lemmon || Mount Lemmon Survey || H || align=right data-sort-value="0.45" | 450 m || 
|-id=789 bgcolor=#d6d6d6
| 497789 ||  || — || September 25, 2006 || Kitt Peak || Spacewatch || URS || align=right | 2.9 km || 
|-id=790 bgcolor=#fefefe
| 497790 ||  || — || September 19, 2006 || Catalina || CSS ||  || align=right | 1.2 km || 
|-id=791 bgcolor=#d6d6d6
| 497791 ||  || — || September 19, 2006 || Kitt Peak || Spacewatch || THM || align=right | 1.9 km || 
|-id=792 bgcolor=#d6d6d6
| 497792 ||  || — || September 30, 2006 || Mount Lemmon || Mount Lemmon Survey || URS  ELF || align=right | 2.1 km || 
|-id=793 bgcolor=#d6d6d6
| 497793 ||  || — || September 26, 2006 || Mount Lemmon || Mount Lemmon Survey || THM || align=right | 1.7 km || 
|-id=794 bgcolor=#d6d6d6
| 497794 ||  || — || September 26, 2006 || Mount Lemmon || Mount Lemmon Survey || EOS || align=right | 2.6 km || 
|-id=795 bgcolor=#d6d6d6
| 497795 ||  || — || September 26, 2006 || Mount Lemmon || Mount Lemmon Survey ||  || align=right | 3.6 km || 
|-id=796 bgcolor=#fefefe
| 497796 ||  || — || September 27, 2006 || Mount Lemmon || Mount Lemmon Survey ||  || align=right data-sort-value="0.54" | 540 m || 
|-id=797 bgcolor=#d6d6d6
| 497797 ||  || — || September 17, 2006 || Kitt Peak || Spacewatch || EOS || align=right | 1.4 km || 
|-id=798 bgcolor=#fefefe
| 497798 ||  || — || October 2, 2006 || Mount Lemmon || Mount Lemmon Survey ||  || align=right data-sort-value="0.60" | 600 m || 
|-id=799 bgcolor=#d6d6d6
| 497799 ||  || — || October 2, 2006 || Mount Lemmon || Mount Lemmon Survey || TIR || align=right | 2.8 km || 
|-id=800 bgcolor=#fefefe
| 497800 ||  || — || October 4, 2006 || Mount Lemmon || Mount Lemmon Survey ||  || align=right data-sort-value="0.68" | 680 m || 
|}

497801–497900 

|-bgcolor=#d6d6d6
| 497801 ||  || — || October 11, 2006 || Kitt Peak || Spacewatch ||  || align=right | 2.5 km || 
|-id=802 bgcolor=#d6d6d6
| 497802 ||  || — || October 3, 2006 || Mount Lemmon || Mount Lemmon Survey ||  || align=right | 3.0 km || 
|-id=803 bgcolor=#d6d6d6
| 497803 ||  || — || September 30, 2006 || Mount Lemmon || Mount Lemmon Survey ||  || align=right | 2.7 km || 
|-id=804 bgcolor=#d6d6d6
| 497804 ||  || — || September 26, 2006 || Mount Lemmon || Mount Lemmon Survey ||  || align=right | 3.2 km || 
|-id=805 bgcolor=#d6d6d6
| 497805 ||  || — || September 25, 2006 || Mount Lemmon || Mount Lemmon Survey || THM || align=right | 1.8 km || 
|-id=806 bgcolor=#d6d6d6
| 497806 ||  || — || September 26, 2006 || Mount Lemmon || Mount Lemmon Survey ||  || align=right | 2.2 km || 
|-id=807 bgcolor=#fefefe
| 497807 ||  || — || October 12, 2006 || Kitt Peak || Spacewatch ||  || align=right data-sort-value="0.83" | 830 m || 
|-id=808 bgcolor=#d6d6d6
| 497808 ||  || — || September 27, 2006 || Mount Lemmon || Mount Lemmon Survey ||  || align=right | 2.6 km || 
|-id=809 bgcolor=#d6d6d6
| 497809 ||  || — || October 12, 2006 || Kitt Peak || Spacewatch ||  || align=right | 3.6 km || 
|-id=810 bgcolor=#d6d6d6
| 497810 ||  || — || October 11, 2006 || Kitt Peak || Spacewatch || HYG || align=right | 2.9 km || 
|-id=811 bgcolor=#d6d6d6
| 497811 ||  || — || October 2, 2006 || Mount Lemmon || Mount Lemmon Survey ||  || align=right | 2.4 km || 
|-id=812 bgcolor=#d6d6d6
| 497812 ||  || — || October 12, 2006 || Kitt Peak || Spacewatch ||  || align=right | 2.5 km || 
|-id=813 bgcolor=#d6d6d6
| 497813 ||  || — || October 2, 2006 || Mount Lemmon || Mount Lemmon Survey || EOS || align=right | 2.9 km || 
|-id=814 bgcolor=#d6d6d6
| 497814 ||  || — || September 26, 2006 || Mount Lemmon || Mount Lemmon Survey || TIR || align=right | 3.3 km || 
|-id=815 bgcolor=#d6d6d6
| 497815 ||  || — || October 15, 2006 || Kitt Peak || Spacewatch || THM || align=right | 2.1 km || 
|-id=816 bgcolor=#fefefe
| 497816 ||  || — || October 15, 2006 || Kitt Peak || Spacewatch ||  || align=right data-sort-value="0.58" | 580 m || 
|-id=817 bgcolor=#fefefe
| 497817 ||  || — || October 15, 2006 || Kitt Peak || Spacewatch ||  || align=right data-sort-value="0.68" | 680 m || 
|-id=818 bgcolor=#d6d6d6
| 497818 ||  || — || October 15, 2006 || Kitt Peak || Spacewatch || THM || align=right | 1.8 km || 
|-id=819 bgcolor=#d6d6d6
| 497819 ||  || — || October 3, 2006 || Apache Point || A. C. Becker ||  || align=right | 2.2 km || 
|-id=820 bgcolor=#d6d6d6
| 497820 ||  || — || October 12, 2006 || Apache Point || A. C. Becker || VER || align=right | 2.1 km || 
|-id=821 bgcolor=#fefefe
| 497821 ||  || — || October 12, 2006 || Kitt Peak || Spacewatch ||  || align=right data-sort-value="0.65" | 650 m || 
|-id=822 bgcolor=#d6d6d6
| 497822 ||  || — || October 3, 2006 || Mount Lemmon || Mount Lemmon Survey || HYG || align=right | 2.4 km || 
|-id=823 bgcolor=#d6d6d6
| 497823 ||  || — || October 2, 2006 || Mount Lemmon || Mount Lemmon Survey ||  || align=right | 2.5 km || 
|-id=824 bgcolor=#d6d6d6
| 497824 ||  || — || October 4, 2006 || Mount Lemmon || Mount Lemmon Survey || EOS || align=right | 2.5 km || 
|-id=825 bgcolor=#d6d6d6
| 497825 ||  || — || October 11, 2006 || Palomar || NEAT || THB || align=right | 2.8 km || 
|-id=826 bgcolor=#d6d6d6
| 497826 ||  || — || September 17, 2006 || Kitt Peak || Spacewatch || LIX || align=right | 3.0 km || 
|-id=827 bgcolor=#fefefe
| 497827 ||  || — || September 23, 2006 || Kitt Peak || Spacewatch || MAS || align=right data-sort-value="0.58" | 580 m || 
|-id=828 bgcolor=#d6d6d6
| 497828 ||  || — || September 25, 2006 || Kitt Peak || Spacewatch ||  || align=right | 2.6 km || 
|-id=829 bgcolor=#E9E9E9
| 497829 ||  || — || October 16, 2006 || Kitt Peak || Spacewatch ||  || align=right | 1.3 km || 
|-id=830 bgcolor=#fefefe
| 497830 ||  || — || September 25, 2006 || Kitt Peak || Spacewatch || NYS || align=right data-sort-value="0.55" | 550 m || 
|-id=831 bgcolor=#d6d6d6
| 497831 ||  || — || October 16, 2006 || Kitt Peak || Spacewatch || (5651) || align=right | 2.9 km || 
|-id=832 bgcolor=#d6d6d6
| 497832 ||  || — || October 16, 2006 || Kitt Peak || Spacewatch || HYG || align=right | 1.9 km || 
|-id=833 bgcolor=#fefefe
| 497833 ||  || — || October 4, 2006 || Mount Lemmon || Mount Lemmon Survey ||  || align=right data-sort-value="0.70" | 700 m || 
|-id=834 bgcolor=#d6d6d6
| 497834 ||  || — || October 16, 2006 || Kitt Peak || Spacewatch ||  || align=right | 2.0 km || 
|-id=835 bgcolor=#fefefe
| 497835 ||  || — || October 16, 2006 || Kitt Peak || Spacewatch || MAS || align=right data-sort-value="0.51" | 510 m || 
|-id=836 bgcolor=#fefefe
| 497836 ||  || — || October 16, 2006 || Kitt Peak || Spacewatch ||  || align=right data-sort-value="0.78" | 780 m || 
|-id=837 bgcolor=#d6d6d6
| 497837 ||  || — || October 17, 2006 || Kitt Peak || Spacewatch || EOS || align=right | 1.6 km || 
|-id=838 bgcolor=#d6d6d6
| 497838 ||  || — || September 25, 2006 || Kitt Peak || Spacewatch ||  || align=right | 3.0 km || 
|-id=839 bgcolor=#d6d6d6
| 497839 ||  || — || October 4, 2006 || Mount Lemmon || Mount Lemmon Survey ||  || align=right | 2.9 km || 
|-id=840 bgcolor=#d6d6d6
| 497840 ||  || — || October 17, 2006 || Kitt Peak || Spacewatch || URS || align=right | 2.9 km || 
|-id=841 bgcolor=#d6d6d6
| 497841 ||  || — || October 19, 2006 || Kitt Peak || Spacewatch ||  || align=right | 2.1 km || 
|-id=842 bgcolor=#fefefe
| 497842 ||  || — || August 28, 2006 || Kitt Peak || Spacewatch || MAS || align=right data-sort-value="0.54" | 540 m || 
|-id=843 bgcolor=#fefefe
| 497843 ||  || — || September 26, 2006 || Kitt Peak || Spacewatch ||  || align=right data-sort-value="0.67" | 670 m || 
|-id=844 bgcolor=#d6d6d6
| 497844 ||  || — || September 25, 2006 || Kitt Peak || Spacewatch || URS || align=right | 3.4 km || 
|-id=845 bgcolor=#d6d6d6
| 497845 ||  || — || September 26, 2006 || Kitt Peak || Spacewatch || HYG || align=right | 2.3 km || 
|-id=846 bgcolor=#d6d6d6
| 497846 ||  || — || October 17, 2006 || Kitt Peak || Spacewatch ||  || align=right | 4.3 km || 
|-id=847 bgcolor=#d6d6d6
| 497847 ||  || — || October 3, 2006 || Kitt Peak || Spacewatch ||  || align=right | 3.4 km || 
|-id=848 bgcolor=#d6d6d6
| 497848 ||  || — || October 17, 2006 || Catalina || CSS || EUP || align=right | 3.4 km || 
|-id=849 bgcolor=#d6d6d6
| 497849 ||  || — || September 30, 2006 || Mount Lemmon || Mount Lemmon Survey ||  || align=right | 2.8 km || 
|-id=850 bgcolor=#d6d6d6
| 497850 ||  || — || September 28, 2006 || Catalina || CSS ||  || align=right | 3.1 km || 
|-id=851 bgcolor=#d6d6d6
| 497851 ||  || — || October 18, 2006 || Kitt Peak || Spacewatch ||  || align=right | 2.5 km || 
|-id=852 bgcolor=#fefefe
| 497852 ||  || — || October 2, 2006 || Mount Lemmon || Mount Lemmon Survey || MAS || align=right data-sort-value="0.77" | 770 m || 
|-id=853 bgcolor=#d6d6d6
| 497853 ||  || — || September 30, 2006 || Mount Lemmon || Mount Lemmon Survey || URS || align=right | 2.7 km || 
|-id=854 bgcolor=#d6d6d6
| 497854 ||  || — || September 30, 2006 || Mount Lemmon || Mount Lemmon Survey || ALA || align=right | 3.2 km || 
|-id=855 bgcolor=#d6d6d6
| 497855 ||  || — || September 24, 2006 || Kitt Peak || Spacewatch ||  || align=right | 2.3 km || 
|-id=856 bgcolor=#d6d6d6
| 497856 ||  || — || September 30, 2006 || Mount Lemmon || Mount Lemmon Survey || HYG || align=right | 2.6 km || 
|-id=857 bgcolor=#d6d6d6
| 497857 ||  || — || October 19, 2006 || Kitt Peak || Spacewatch ||  || align=right | 2.3 km || 
|-id=858 bgcolor=#d6d6d6
| 497858 ||  || — || October 19, 2006 || Kitt Peak || Spacewatch ||  || align=right | 2.0 km || 
|-id=859 bgcolor=#fefefe
| 497859 ||  || — || September 19, 2006 || Kitt Peak || Spacewatch || NYS || align=right data-sort-value="0.49" | 490 m || 
|-id=860 bgcolor=#fefefe
| 497860 ||  || — || October 2, 2006 || Mount Lemmon || Mount Lemmon Survey || NYS || align=right data-sort-value="0.58" | 580 m || 
|-id=861 bgcolor=#fefefe
| 497861 ||  || — || October 19, 2006 || Kitt Peak || Spacewatch || SUL || align=right | 1.8 km || 
|-id=862 bgcolor=#d6d6d6
| 497862 ||  || — || October 19, 2006 || Kitt Peak || Spacewatch || HYG || align=right | 2.8 km || 
|-id=863 bgcolor=#d6d6d6
| 497863 ||  || — || September 19, 2006 || Kitt Peak || Spacewatch ||  || align=right | 2.8 km || 
|-id=864 bgcolor=#d6d6d6
| 497864 ||  || — || October 21, 2006 || Mount Lemmon || Mount Lemmon Survey || THM || align=right | 1.9 km || 
|-id=865 bgcolor=#fefefe
| 497865 ||  || — || October 2, 2006 || Mount Lemmon || Mount Lemmon Survey ||  || align=right data-sort-value="0.60" | 600 m || 
|-id=866 bgcolor=#d6d6d6
| 497866 ||  || — || November 15, 1995 || Kitt Peak || Spacewatch || HYG || align=right | 2.4 km || 
|-id=867 bgcolor=#d6d6d6
| 497867 ||  || — || October 3, 2006 || Mount Lemmon || Mount Lemmon Survey ||  || align=right | 2.4 km || 
|-id=868 bgcolor=#fefefe
| 497868 ||  || — || September 26, 2006 || Catalina || CSS ||  || align=right data-sort-value="0.81" | 810 m || 
|-id=869 bgcolor=#d6d6d6
| 497869 ||  || — || September 28, 2006 || Catalina || CSS ||  || align=right | 2.8 km || 
|-id=870 bgcolor=#fefefe
| 497870 ||  || — || September 27, 2006 || Kitt Peak || Spacewatch || V || align=right data-sort-value="0.50" | 500 m || 
|-id=871 bgcolor=#fefefe
| 497871 ||  || — || October 20, 2006 || Kitt Peak || Spacewatch ||  || align=right data-sort-value="0.71" | 710 m || 
|-id=872 bgcolor=#fefefe
| 497872 ||  || — || October 20, 2006 || Kitt Peak || Spacewatch ||  || align=right data-sort-value="0.49" | 490 m || 
|-id=873 bgcolor=#d6d6d6
| 497873 ||  || — || October 20, 2006 || Kitt Peak || Spacewatch || THM || align=right | 2.2 km || 
|-id=874 bgcolor=#d6d6d6
| 497874 ||  || — || October 4, 2006 || Mount Lemmon || Mount Lemmon Survey ||  || align=right | 2.2 km || 
|-id=875 bgcolor=#d6d6d6
| 497875 ||  || — || October 4, 2006 || Mount Lemmon || Mount Lemmon Survey ||  || align=right | 3.1 km || 
|-id=876 bgcolor=#d6d6d6
| 497876 ||  || — || April 20, 2004 || Kitt Peak || Spacewatch ||  || align=right | 3.0 km || 
|-id=877 bgcolor=#d6d6d6
| 497877 ||  || — || October 4, 2006 || Mount Lemmon || Mount Lemmon Survey || VER || align=right | 2.8 km || 
|-id=878 bgcolor=#d6d6d6
| 497878 ||  || — || September 26, 2006 || Mount Lemmon || Mount Lemmon Survey || TIR || align=right | 3.3 km || 
|-id=879 bgcolor=#d6d6d6
| 497879 ||  || — || September 16, 2006 || Catalina || CSS ||  || align=right | 3.2 km || 
|-id=880 bgcolor=#fefefe
| 497880 ||  || — || October 20, 2006 || Palomar || NEAT ||  || align=right | 1.1 km || 
|-id=881 bgcolor=#fefefe
| 497881 ||  || — || September 28, 2006 || Mount Lemmon || Mount Lemmon Survey ||  || align=right data-sort-value="0.58" | 580 m || 
|-id=882 bgcolor=#fefefe
| 497882 ||  || — || September 25, 2006 || Kitt Peak || Spacewatch ||  || align=right data-sort-value="0.62" | 620 m || 
|-id=883 bgcolor=#fefefe
| 497883 ||  || — || September 28, 2006 || Mount Lemmon || Mount Lemmon Survey ||  || align=right data-sort-value="0.68" | 680 m || 
|-id=884 bgcolor=#d6d6d6
| 497884 ||  || — || October 27, 2006 || Mount Lemmon || Mount Lemmon Survey || THM || align=right | 2.0 km || 
|-id=885 bgcolor=#fefefe
| 497885 ||  || — || October 28, 2006 || Mount Lemmon || Mount Lemmon Survey || NYS || align=right data-sort-value="0.58" | 580 m || 
|-id=886 bgcolor=#fefefe
| 497886 ||  || — || October 27, 2006 || Kitt Peak || Spacewatch ||  || align=right data-sort-value="0.76" | 760 m || 
|-id=887 bgcolor=#FA8072
| 497887 ||  || — || October 27, 2006 || Kitt Peak || Spacewatch ||  || align=right data-sort-value="0.76" | 760 m || 
|-id=888 bgcolor=#d6d6d6
| 497888 ||  || — || September 14, 2006 || Kitt Peak || Spacewatch || LIX || align=right | 2.3 km || 
|-id=889 bgcolor=#fefefe
| 497889 ||  || — || October 2, 2006 || Mount Lemmon || Mount Lemmon Survey || MAS || align=right data-sort-value="0.54" | 540 m || 
|-id=890 bgcolor=#d6d6d6
| 497890 ||  || — || October 28, 2006 || Kitt Peak || Spacewatch || THM || align=right | 1.8 km || 
|-id=891 bgcolor=#d6d6d6
| 497891 ||  || — || September 30, 2006 || Catalina || CSS || LIX || align=right | 3.8 km || 
|-id=892 bgcolor=#fefefe
| 497892 ||  || — || October 28, 2006 || Kitt Peak || Spacewatch || NYS || align=right data-sort-value="0.43" | 430 m || 
|-id=893 bgcolor=#fefefe
| 497893 ||  || — || October 16, 2006 || Kitt Peak || Spacewatch ||  || align=right data-sort-value="0.66" | 660 m || 
|-id=894 bgcolor=#d6d6d6
| 497894 ||  || — || September 26, 2006 || Kitt Peak || Spacewatch || HYG || align=right | 2.7 km || 
|-id=895 bgcolor=#d6d6d6
| 497895 ||  || — || September 30, 2006 || Mount Lemmon || Mount Lemmon Survey || EOS || align=right | 2.2 km || 
|-id=896 bgcolor=#fefefe
| 497896 ||  || — || October 16, 2006 || Kitt Peak || Spacewatch || MAS || align=right data-sort-value="0.50" | 500 m || 
|-id=897 bgcolor=#d6d6d6
| 497897 ||  || — || September 30, 2006 || Mount Lemmon || Mount Lemmon Survey ||  || align=right | 2.8 km || 
|-id=898 bgcolor=#d6d6d6
| 497898 ||  || — || October 19, 2006 || Kitt Peak || M. W. Buie ||  || align=right | 2.3 km || 
|-id=899 bgcolor=#fefefe
| 497899 ||  || — || October 21, 2006 || Kitt Peak || Spacewatch ||  || align=right data-sort-value="0.75" | 750 m || 
|-id=900 bgcolor=#fefefe
| 497900 ||  || — || October 18, 2006 || Kitt Peak || Spacewatch || NYS || align=right data-sort-value="0.55" | 550 m || 
|}

497901–498000 

|-bgcolor=#fefefe
| 497901 ||  || — || October 21, 2006 || Kitt Peak || Spacewatch ||  || align=right data-sort-value="0.76" | 760 m || 
|-id=902 bgcolor=#fefefe
| 497902 ||  || — || October 3, 2006 || Mount Lemmon || Mount Lemmon Survey || NYS || align=right data-sort-value="0.72" | 720 m || 
|-id=903 bgcolor=#fefefe
| 497903 ||  || — || September 28, 2006 || Mount Lemmon || Mount Lemmon Survey ||  || align=right data-sort-value="0.65" | 650 m || 
|-id=904 bgcolor=#fefefe
| 497904 ||  || — || October 27, 2006 || Mount Lemmon || Mount Lemmon Survey ||  || align=right data-sort-value="0.64" | 640 m || 
|-id=905 bgcolor=#fefefe
| 497905 ||  || — || November 1, 2006 || Mount Lemmon || Mount Lemmon Survey ||  || align=right data-sort-value="0.62" | 620 m || 
|-id=906 bgcolor=#fefefe
| 497906 ||  || — || November 9, 2006 || Kitt Peak || Spacewatch ||  || align=right data-sort-value="0.67" | 670 m || 
|-id=907 bgcolor=#fefefe
| 497907 ||  || — || November 9, 2006 || Kitt Peak || Spacewatch || NYS || align=right data-sort-value="0.65" | 650 m || 
|-id=908 bgcolor=#fefefe
| 497908 ||  || — || September 28, 2006 || Mount Lemmon || Mount Lemmon Survey || NYS || align=right data-sort-value="0.78" | 780 m || 
|-id=909 bgcolor=#fefefe
| 497909 ||  || — || September 27, 2006 || Mount Lemmon || Mount Lemmon Survey || MAS || align=right data-sort-value="0.56" | 560 m || 
|-id=910 bgcolor=#fefefe
| 497910 ||  || — || October 21, 2006 || Kitt Peak || Spacewatch ||  || align=right data-sort-value="0.69" | 690 m || 
|-id=911 bgcolor=#fefefe
| 497911 ||  || — || November 12, 2006 || Mount Lemmon || Mount Lemmon Survey ||  || align=right data-sort-value="0.67" | 670 m || 
|-id=912 bgcolor=#d6d6d6
| 497912 ||  || — || November 13, 2006 || Socorro || LINEAR || EUP || align=right | 3.9 km || 
|-id=913 bgcolor=#d6d6d6
| 497913 ||  || — || November 9, 2006 || Kitt Peak || Spacewatch ||  || align=right | 2.8 km || 
|-id=914 bgcolor=#d6d6d6
| 497914 ||  || — || November 11, 2006 || Kitt Peak || Spacewatch || VER || align=right | 2.6 km || 
|-id=915 bgcolor=#d6d6d6
| 497915 ||  || — || October 23, 2006 || Kitt Peak || Spacewatch ||  || align=right | 3.1 km || 
|-id=916 bgcolor=#fefefe
| 497916 ||  || — || November 11, 2006 || Kitt Peak || Spacewatch || MAS || align=right data-sort-value="0.67" | 670 m || 
|-id=917 bgcolor=#fefefe
| 497917 ||  || — || October 22, 2006 || Mount Lemmon || Mount Lemmon Survey ||  || align=right data-sort-value="0.66" | 660 m || 
|-id=918 bgcolor=#fefefe
| 497918 ||  || — || November 11, 2006 || Kitt Peak || Spacewatch || NYS || align=right data-sort-value="0.79" | 790 m || 
|-id=919 bgcolor=#d6d6d6
| 497919 ||  || — || November 11, 2006 || Kitt Peak || Spacewatch || EUP || align=right | 4.4 km || 
|-id=920 bgcolor=#E9E9E9
| 497920 ||  || — || October 31, 2006 || Mount Lemmon || Mount Lemmon Survey ||  || align=right data-sort-value="0.94" | 940 m || 
|-id=921 bgcolor=#d6d6d6
| 497921 ||  || — || November 13, 2006 || Kitt Peak || Spacewatch ||  || align=right | 2.1 km || 
|-id=922 bgcolor=#fefefe
| 497922 ||  || — || November 11, 2006 || Kitt Peak || Spacewatch ||  || align=right data-sort-value="0.65" | 650 m || 
|-id=923 bgcolor=#d6d6d6
| 497923 ||  || — || November 11, 2006 || Kitt Peak || Spacewatch || HYG || align=right | 2.6 km || 
|-id=924 bgcolor=#d6d6d6
| 497924 ||  || — || September 28, 2006 || Mount Lemmon || Mount Lemmon Survey || THB || align=right | 3.1 km || 
|-id=925 bgcolor=#fefefe
| 497925 ||  || — || October 31, 2006 || Kitt Peak || Spacewatch || NYS || align=right data-sort-value="0.47" | 470 m || 
|-id=926 bgcolor=#d6d6d6
| 497926 ||  || — || October 19, 2006 || Catalina || CSS ||  || align=right | 4.0 km || 
|-id=927 bgcolor=#fefefe
| 497927 ||  || — || November 1, 2006 || Mount Lemmon || Mount Lemmon Survey ||  || align=right data-sort-value="0.51" | 510 m || 
|-id=928 bgcolor=#d6d6d6
| 497928 ||  || — || November 15, 2006 || Kitt Peak || Spacewatch ||  || align=right | 2.5 km || 
|-id=929 bgcolor=#fefefe
| 497929 ||  || — || October 27, 2006 || Mount Lemmon || Mount Lemmon Survey || V || align=right data-sort-value="0.49" | 490 m || 
|-id=930 bgcolor=#d6d6d6
| 497930 ||  || — || October 23, 2006 || Catalina || CSS ||  || align=right | 4.2 km || 
|-id=931 bgcolor=#fefefe
| 497931 ||  || — || November 11, 2006 || Kitt Peak || Spacewatch ||  || align=right data-sort-value="0.65" | 650 m || 
|-id=932 bgcolor=#fefefe
| 497932 ||  || — || September 28, 2006 || Mount Lemmon || Mount Lemmon Survey || MAS || align=right data-sort-value="0.71" | 710 m || 
|-id=933 bgcolor=#fefefe
| 497933 ||  || — || October 23, 2006 || Mount Lemmon || Mount Lemmon Survey ||  || align=right data-sort-value="0.71" | 710 m || 
|-id=934 bgcolor=#fefefe
| 497934 ||  || — || November 16, 2006 || Mount Lemmon || Mount Lemmon Survey ||  || align=right data-sort-value="0.64" | 640 m || 
|-id=935 bgcolor=#d6d6d6
| 497935 ||  || — || September 30, 2006 || Mount Lemmon || Mount Lemmon Survey || 7:4 || align=right | 2.8 km || 
|-id=936 bgcolor=#d6d6d6
| 497936 ||  || — || November 16, 2006 || Mount Lemmon || Mount Lemmon Survey || ALA || align=right | 3.9 km || 
|-id=937 bgcolor=#fefefe
| 497937 ||  || — || October 19, 2006 || Catalina || CSS || H || align=right data-sort-value="0.66" | 660 m || 
|-id=938 bgcolor=#fefefe
| 497938 ||  || — || September 25, 2006 || Mount Lemmon || Mount Lemmon Survey || NYS || align=right data-sort-value="0.53" | 530 m || 
|-id=939 bgcolor=#fefefe
| 497939 ||  || — || September 28, 2006 || Mount Lemmon || Mount Lemmon Survey ||  || align=right data-sort-value="0.67" | 670 m || 
|-id=940 bgcolor=#fefefe
| 497940 ||  || — || November 19, 2006 || Kitt Peak || Spacewatch ||  || align=right data-sort-value="0.66" | 660 m || 
|-id=941 bgcolor=#fefefe
| 497941 ||  || — || November 19, 2006 || Kitt Peak || Spacewatch || NYS || align=right data-sort-value="0.55" | 550 m || 
|-id=942 bgcolor=#fefefe
| 497942 ||  || — || November 19, 2006 || Kitt Peak || Spacewatch || MAS || align=right data-sort-value="0.60" | 600 m || 
|-id=943 bgcolor=#fefefe
| 497943 ||  || — || October 27, 2006 || Mount Lemmon || Mount Lemmon Survey || MAS || align=right data-sort-value="0.63" | 630 m || 
|-id=944 bgcolor=#fefefe
| 497944 ||  || — || October 23, 2006 || Mount Lemmon || Mount Lemmon Survey ||  || align=right data-sort-value="0.60" | 600 m || 
|-id=945 bgcolor=#d6d6d6
| 497945 ||  || — || November 20, 2006 || Socorro || LINEAR || LIX || align=right | 3.2 km || 
|-id=946 bgcolor=#d6d6d6
| 497946 ||  || — || September 28, 2006 || Mount Lemmon || Mount Lemmon Survey ||  || align=right | 2.7 km || 
|-id=947 bgcolor=#fefefe
| 497947 ||  || — || November 20, 2006 || Kitt Peak || Spacewatch ||  || align=right data-sort-value="0.66" | 660 m || 
|-id=948 bgcolor=#E9E9E9
| 497948 ||  || — || November 20, 2006 || Kitt Peak || Spacewatch || (5) || align=right | 1.00 km || 
|-id=949 bgcolor=#fefefe
| 497949 ||  || — || November 22, 2006 || Kitt Peak || Spacewatch ||  || align=right data-sort-value="0.65" | 650 m || 
|-id=950 bgcolor=#d6d6d6
| 497950 ||  || — || November 24, 2006 || Mount Lemmon || Mount Lemmon Survey || HYG || align=right | 2.3 km || 
|-id=951 bgcolor=#fefefe
| 497951 ||  || — || November 16, 2006 || Kitt Peak || Spacewatch ||  || align=right data-sort-value="0.85" | 850 m || 
|-id=952 bgcolor=#d6d6d6
| 497952 ||  || — || September 28, 2006 || Mount Lemmon || Mount Lemmon Survey || HYG || align=right | 3.1 km || 
|-id=953 bgcolor=#E9E9E9
| 497953 ||  || — || November 27, 2006 || Mount Lemmon || Mount Lemmon Survey ||  || align=right | 1.1 km || 
|-id=954 bgcolor=#d6d6d6
| 497954 ||  || — || October 31, 2006 || Kitt Peak || Spacewatch ||  || align=right | 3.0 km || 
|-id=955 bgcolor=#fefefe
| 497955 ||  || — || December 1, 2006 || Mount Lemmon || Mount Lemmon Survey || NYS || align=right data-sort-value="0.72" | 720 m || 
|-id=956 bgcolor=#fefefe
| 497956 ||  || — || December 11, 2006 || Kitt Peak || Spacewatch ||  || align=right data-sort-value="0.73" | 730 m || 
|-id=957 bgcolor=#E9E9E9
| 497957 ||  || — || December 11, 2006 || Kitt Peak || Spacewatch ||  || align=right | 1.5 km || 
|-id=958 bgcolor=#fefefe
| 497958 ||  || — || December 11, 2006 || Kitt Peak || Spacewatch ||  || align=right data-sort-value="0.85" | 850 m || 
|-id=959 bgcolor=#d6d6d6
| 497959 ||  || — || November 15, 2006 || Mount Lemmon || Mount Lemmon Survey || 7:4 || align=right | 4.1 km || 
|-id=960 bgcolor=#d6d6d6
| 497960 ||  || — || October 23, 2006 || Catalina || CSS ||  || align=right | 3.9 km || 
|-id=961 bgcolor=#E9E9E9
| 497961 ||  || — || December 23, 2006 || Catalina || CSS ||  || align=right | 2.7 km || 
|-id=962 bgcolor=#E9E9E9
| 497962 ||  || — || January 10, 2007 || Mount Lemmon || Mount Lemmon Survey || EUN || align=right data-sort-value="0.94" | 940 m || 
|-id=963 bgcolor=#E9E9E9
| 497963 ||  || — || January 10, 2007 || Mount Lemmon || Mount Lemmon Survey ||  || align=right data-sort-value="0.72" | 720 m || 
|-id=964 bgcolor=#E9E9E9
| 497964 ||  || — || January 10, 2007 || Kitt Peak || Spacewatch ||  || align=right | 1.1 km || 
|-id=965 bgcolor=#E9E9E9
| 497965 ||  || — || January 16, 2007 || Catalina || CSS ||  || align=right | 1.0 km || 
|-id=966 bgcolor=#E9E9E9
| 497966 ||  || — || January 17, 2007 || Kitt Peak || Spacewatch || EUN || align=right | 1.7 km || 
|-id=967 bgcolor=#E9E9E9
| 497967 ||  || — || January 24, 2007 || Socorro || LINEAR ||  || align=right | 1.1 km || 
|-id=968 bgcolor=#E9E9E9
| 497968 ||  || — || January 24, 2007 || Mount Lemmon || Mount Lemmon Survey ||  || align=right data-sort-value="0.71" | 710 m || 
|-id=969 bgcolor=#E9E9E9
| 497969 ||  || — || January 8, 2007 || Mount Lemmon || Mount Lemmon Survey ||  || align=right | 1.2 km || 
|-id=970 bgcolor=#E9E9E9
| 497970 ||  || — || December 24, 2006 || Kitt Peak || Spacewatch ||  || align=right | 1.7 km || 
|-id=971 bgcolor=#E9E9E9
| 497971 ||  || — || November 22, 2006 || Mount Lemmon || Mount Lemmon Survey ||  || align=right | 1.0 km || 
|-id=972 bgcolor=#E9E9E9
| 497972 ||  || — || January 27, 2007 || Kitt Peak || Spacewatch ||  || align=right data-sort-value="0.71" | 710 m || 
|-id=973 bgcolor=#E9E9E9
| 497973 ||  || — || January 17, 2007 || Palomar || NEAT || BRU || align=right | 1.4 km || 
|-id=974 bgcolor=#fefefe
| 497974 ||  || — || January 27, 2007 || Kitt Peak || Spacewatch ||  || align=right data-sort-value="0.66" | 660 m || 
|-id=975 bgcolor=#d6d6d6
| 497975 ||  || — || January 10, 2007 || Mount Lemmon || Mount Lemmon Survey || 7:4 || align=right | 2.8 km || 
|-id=976 bgcolor=#E9E9E9
| 497976 ||  || — || February 8, 2007 || Mount Lemmon || Mount Lemmon Survey ||  || align=right data-sort-value="0.85" | 850 m || 
|-id=977 bgcolor=#fefefe
| 497977 ||  || — || January 9, 2007 || Mount Lemmon || Mount Lemmon Survey ||  || align=right data-sort-value="0.60" | 600 m || 
|-id=978 bgcolor=#E9E9E9
| 497978 ||  || — || January 25, 2007 || Kitt Peak || Spacewatch || KON || align=right | 1.8 km || 
|-id=979 bgcolor=#E9E9E9
| 497979 ||  || — || January 27, 2007 || Kitt Peak || Spacewatch || ADE || align=right | 1.3 km || 
|-id=980 bgcolor=#E9E9E9
| 497980 ||  || — || November 27, 2006 || Mount Lemmon || Mount Lemmon Survey ||  || align=right | 1.0 km || 
|-id=981 bgcolor=#E9E9E9
| 497981 ||  || — || February 9, 2007 || Catalina || CSS ||  || align=right | 2.5 km || 
|-id=982 bgcolor=#E9E9E9
| 497982 ||  || — || February 9, 2007 || Catalina || CSS ||  || align=right | 1.5 km || 
|-id=983 bgcolor=#E9E9E9
| 497983 ||  || — || February 17, 2007 || Kitt Peak || Spacewatch ||  || align=right data-sort-value="0.98" | 980 m || 
|-id=984 bgcolor=#E9E9E9
| 497984 ||  || — || February 17, 2007 || Kitt Peak || Spacewatch ||  || align=right | 1.6 km || 
|-id=985 bgcolor=#E9E9E9
| 497985 ||  || — || February 17, 2007 || Kitt Peak || Spacewatch ||  || align=right data-sort-value="0.77" | 770 m || 
|-id=986 bgcolor=#E9E9E9
| 497986 ||  || — || February 17, 2007 || Kitt Peak || Spacewatch ||  || align=right data-sort-value="0.78" | 780 m || 
|-id=987 bgcolor=#E9E9E9
| 497987 ||  || — || February 17, 2007 || Kitt Peak || Spacewatch ||  || align=right | 1.1 km || 
|-id=988 bgcolor=#E9E9E9
| 497988 ||  || — || February 17, 2007 || Kitt Peak || Spacewatch || EUN || align=right | 1.5 km || 
|-id=989 bgcolor=#E9E9E9
| 497989 ||  || — || January 10, 2007 || Kitt Peak || Spacewatch ||  || align=right data-sort-value="0.85" | 850 m || 
|-id=990 bgcolor=#E9E9E9
| 497990 ||  || — || February 17, 2007 || Mount Lemmon || Mount Lemmon Survey || MAR || align=right | 1.4 km || 
|-id=991 bgcolor=#E9E9E9
| 497991 ||  || — || February 17, 2007 || Mount Lemmon || Mount Lemmon Survey || MAR || align=right | 1.2 km || 
|-id=992 bgcolor=#E9E9E9
| 497992 ||  || — || February 21, 2007 || Kitt Peak || Spacewatch ||  || align=right | 1.8 km || 
|-id=993 bgcolor=#fefefe
| 497993 ||  || — || February 21, 2007 || Kitt Peak || Spacewatch || MAS || align=right data-sort-value="0.68" | 680 m || 
|-id=994 bgcolor=#E9E9E9
| 497994 ||  || — || February 23, 2007 || Kitt Peak || Spacewatch || GEF || align=right | 1.2 km || 
|-id=995 bgcolor=#E9E9E9
| 497995 ||  || — || February 25, 2007 || Mount Lemmon || Mount Lemmon Survey ||  || align=right | 1.7 km || 
|-id=996 bgcolor=#E9E9E9
| 497996 ||  || — || February 22, 2007 || Kitt Peak || Spacewatch ||  || align=right | 1.1 km || 
|-id=997 bgcolor=#E9E9E9
| 497997 ||  || — || January 27, 2007 || Kitt Peak || Spacewatch ||  || align=right data-sort-value="0.68" | 680 m || 
|-id=998 bgcolor=#E9E9E9
| 497998 ||  || — || March 10, 2007 || Mount Lemmon || Mount Lemmon Survey ||  || align=right | 1.2 km || 
|-id=999 bgcolor=#E9E9E9
| 497999 ||  || — || March 12, 2007 || Mount Lemmon || Mount Lemmon Survey ||  || align=right data-sort-value="0.76" | 760 m || 
|-id=000 bgcolor=#fefefe
| 498000 ||  || — || February 6, 2007 || Kitt Peak || Spacewatch ||  || align=right data-sort-value="0.81" | 810 m || 
|}

References

External links 
 Discovery Circumstances: Numbered Minor Planets (495001)–(500000) (IAU Minor Planet Center)

0497